

405001–405100 

|-bgcolor=#fefefe
| 405001 ||  || — || September 26, 2000 || Haleakala || NEAT || — || align=right data-sort-value="0.76" | 760 m || 
|-id=002 bgcolor=#fefefe
| 405002 ||  || — || September 21, 2000 || Anderson Mesa || LONEOS || — || align=right data-sort-value="0.69" | 690 m || 
|-id=003 bgcolor=#E9E9E9
| 405003 ||  || — || October 1, 2000 || Socorro || LINEAR || GEF || align=right | 1.3 km || 
|-id=004 bgcolor=#fefefe
| 405004 ||  || — || October 1, 2000 || Socorro || LINEAR || — || align=right | 1.6 km || 
|-id=005 bgcolor=#E9E9E9
| 405005 ||  || — || October 24, 2000 || Socorro || LINEAR || — || align=right | 3.1 km || 
|-id=006 bgcolor=#fefefe
| 405006 ||  || — || October 25, 2000 || Socorro || LINEAR || — || align=right data-sort-value="0.87" | 870 m || 
|-id=007 bgcolor=#FA8072
| 405007 ||  || — || November 1, 2000 || Socorro || LINEAR || — || align=right data-sort-value="0.60" | 600 m || 
|-id=008 bgcolor=#fefefe
| 405008 ||  || — || November 1, 2000 || Socorro || LINEAR || ERI || align=right | 1.7 km || 
|-id=009 bgcolor=#fefefe
| 405009 ||  || — || November 3, 2000 || Socorro || LINEAR || — || align=right data-sort-value="0.76" | 760 m || 
|-id=010 bgcolor=#fefefe
| 405010 ||  || — || November 21, 2000 || Socorro || LINEAR || — || align=right | 1.3 km || 
|-id=011 bgcolor=#E9E9E9
| 405011 ||  || — || November 20, 2000 || Socorro || LINEAR || DOR || align=right | 2.7 km || 
|-id=012 bgcolor=#fefefe
| 405012 ||  || — || November 24, 2000 || Anderson Mesa || LONEOS || — || align=right data-sort-value="0.87" | 870 m || 
|-id=013 bgcolor=#fefefe
| 405013 ||  || — || December 20, 2000 || Kitt Peak || Spacewatch || — || align=right data-sort-value="0.99" | 990 m || 
|-id=014 bgcolor=#d6d6d6
| 405014 ||  || — || February 2, 2001 || Anderson Mesa || LONEOS || EUP || align=right | 4.7 km || 
|-id=015 bgcolor=#d6d6d6
| 405015 ||  || — || February 17, 2001 || Socorro || LINEAR || — || align=right | 3.8 km || 
|-id=016 bgcolor=#d6d6d6
| 405016 ||  || — || February 16, 2001 || Kitt Peak || Spacewatch || — || align=right | 2.6 km || 
|-id=017 bgcolor=#E9E9E9
| 405017 ||  || — || April 24, 2001 || Kitt Peak || Spacewatch || — || align=right | 1.1 km || 
|-id=018 bgcolor=#E9E9E9
| 405018 ||  || — || August 7, 2001 || Haleakala || NEAT || — || align=right | 1.7 km || 
|-id=019 bgcolor=#FA8072
| 405019 ||  || — || August 1, 2001 || Palomar || NEAT || — || align=right data-sort-value="0.63" | 630 m || 
|-id=020 bgcolor=#FA8072
| 405020 ||  || — || August 16, 2001 || Socorro || LINEAR || — || align=right data-sort-value="0.58" | 580 m || 
|-id=021 bgcolor=#E9E9E9
| 405021 ||  || — || August 16, 2001 || Socorro || LINEAR || — || align=right | 1.8 km || 
|-id=022 bgcolor=#E9E9E9
| 405022 ||  || — || August 20, 2001 || Socorro || LINEAR || — || align=right | 1.6 km || 
|-id=023 bgcolor=#E9E9E9
| 405023 ||  || — || August 20, 2001 || Socorro || LINEAR || ADE || align=right | 2.6 km || 
|-id=024 bgcolor=#E9E9E9
| 405024 ||  || — || August 22, 2001 || Socorro || LINEAR || — || align=right | 1.2 km || 
|-id=025 bgcolor=#E9E9E9
| 405025 ||  || — || August 22, 2001 || Socorro || LINEAR || — || align=right | 2.4 km || 
|-id=026 bgcolor=#fefefe
| 405026 ||  || — || August 23, 2001 || Anderson Mesa || LONEOS || — || align=right data-sort-value="0.80" | 800 m || 
|-id=027 bgcolor=#E9E9E9
| 405027 ||  || — || July 27, 2001 || Anderson Mesa || LONEOS || — || align=right | 1.5 km || 
|-id=028 bgcolor=#E9E9E9
| 405028 ||  || — || August 25, 2001 || Socorro || LINEAR || — || align=right | 1.7 km || 
|-id=029 bgcolor=#fefefe
| 405029 ||  || — || August 17, 2001 || Palomar || NEAT || — || align=right data-sort-value="0.73" | 730 m || 
|-id=030 bgcolor=#E9E9E9
| 405030 ||  || — || September 8, 2001 || Socorro || LINEAR || — || align=right | 3.9 km || 
|-id=031 bgcolor=#fefefe
| 405031 ||  || — || September 8, 2001 || Socorro || LINEAR || — || align=right data-sort-value="0.58" | 580 m || 
|-id=032 bgcolor=#E9E9E9
| 405032 ||  || — || September 10, 2001 || Socorro || LINEAR || JUNcritical || align=right data-sort-value="0.80" | 800 m || 
|-id=033 bgcolor=#E9E9E9
| 405033 ||  || — || September 12, 2001 || Kitt Peak || Spacewatch || — || align=right | 2.0 km || 
|-id=034 bgcolor=#E9E9E9
| 405034 ||  || — || September 12, 2001 || Socorro || LINEAR || EUN || align=right | 1.3 km || 
|-id=035 bgcolor=#E9E9E9
| 405035 ||  || — || September 12, 2001 || Socorro || LINEAR || (5) || align=right | 2.2 km || 
|-id=036 bgcolor=#fefefe
| 405036 ||  || — || September 12, 2001 || Socorro || LINEAR || — || align=right data-sort-value="0.70" | 700 m || 
|-id=037 bgcolor=#fefefe
| 405037 ||  || — || September 16, 2001 || Socorro || LINEAR || H || align=right data-sort-value="0.81" | 810 m || 
|-id=038 bgcolor=#fefefe
| 405038 ||  || — || September 16, 2001 || Socorro || LINEAR || H || align=right data-sort-value="0.82" | 820 m || 
|-id=039 bgcolor=#E9E9E9
| 405039 ||  || — || September 17, 2001 || Socorro || LINEAR || — || align=right | 2.6 km || 
|-id=040 bgcolor=#E9E9E9
| 405040 ||  || — || September 11, 2001 || Anderson Mesa || LONEOS || — || align=right | 1.8 km || 
|-id=041 bgcolor=#fefefe
| 405041 ||  || — || September 20, 2001 || Socorro || LINEAR || — || align=right data-sort-value="0.54" | 540 m || 
|-id=042 bgcolor=#E9E9E9
| 405042 ||  || — || September 20, 2001 || Socorro || LINEAR || — || align=right | 1.4 km || 
|-id=043 bgcolor=#fefefe
| 405043 ||  || — || September 21, 2001 || Socorro || LINEAR || H || align=right data-sort-value="0.83" | 830 m || 
|-id=044 bgcolor=#FA8072
| 405044 ||  || — || September 16, 2001 || Socorro || LINEAR || — || align=right data-sort-value="0.73" | 730 m || 
|-id=045 bgcolor=#E9E9E9
| 405045 ||  || — || September 16, 2001 || Socorro || LINEAR || — || align=right | 1.9 km || 
|-id=046 bgcolor=#E9E9E9
| 405046 ||  || — || September 11, 2001 || Anderson Mesa || LONEOS || — || align=right | 1.6 km || 
|-id=047 bgcolor=#E9E9E9
| 405047 ||  || — || September 19, 2001 || Socorro || LINEAR || EUN || align=right | 1.2 km || 
|-id=048 bgcolor=#E9E9E9
| 405048 ||  || — || September 19, 2001 || Socorro || LINEAR || — || align=right | 2.2 km || 
|-id=049 bgcolor=#E9E9E9
| 405049 ||  || — || August 26, 2001 || Kitt Peak || Spacewatch || — || align=right | 1.8 km || 
|-id=050 bgcolor=#E9E9E9
| 405050 ||  || — || September 19, 2001 || Socorro || LINEAR || — || align=right | 1.4 km || 
|-id=051 bgcolor=#E9E9E9
| 405051 ||  || — || September 12, 2001 || Socorro || LINEAR || — || align=right | 1.8 km || 
|-id=052 bgcolor=#E9E9E9
| 405052 ||  || — || September 19, 2001 || Socorro || LINEAR || — || align=right | 1.7 km || 
|-id=053 bgcolor=#fefefe
| 405053 ||  || — || September 19, 2001 || Socorro || LINEAR || — || align=right data-sort-value="0.67" | 670 m || 
|-id=054 bgcolor=#fefefe
| 405054 ||  || — || September 19, 2001 || Socorro || LINEAR || — || align=right data-sort-value="0.86" | 860 m || 
|-id=055 bgcolor=#E9E9E9
| 405055 ||  || — || September 20, 2001 || Socorro || LINEAR || — || align=right | 1.5 km || 
|-id=056 bgcolor=#FA8072
| 405056 ||  || — || September 21, 2001 || Palomar || NEAT || H || align=right data-sort-value="0.78" | 780 m || 
|-id=057 bgcolor=#E9E9E9
| 405057 ||  || — || September 24, 2001 || Palomar || NEAT || EUN || align=right | 1.2 km || 
|-id=058 bgcolor=#B88A00
| 405058 ||  || — || October 13, 2001 || Socorro || LINEAR || unusual || align=right | 5.6 km || 
|-id=059 bgcolor=#E9E9E9
| 405059 ||  || — || October 14, 2001 || Ondřejov || P. Pravec || — || align=right | 1.9 km || 
|-id=060 bgcolor=#fefefe
| 405060 ||  || — || October 11, 2001 || Eskridge || G. Hug || H || align=right data-sort-value="0.59" | 590 m || 
|-id=061 bgcolor=#E9E9E9
| 405061 ||  || — || September 20, 2001 || Socorro || LINEAR || — || align=right | 1.7 km || 
|-id=062 bgcolor=#E9E9E9
| 405062 ||  || — || October 13, 2001 || Socorro || LINEAR || — || align=right | 1.9 km || 
|-id=063 bgcolor=#E9E9E9
| 405063 ||  || — || October 14, 2001 || Socorro || LINEAR || — || align=right | 1.6 km || 
|-id=064 bgcolor=#fefefe
| 405064 ||  || — || October 13, 2001 || Palomar || NEAT || — || align=right data-sort-value="0.98" | 980 m || 
|-id=065 bgcolor=#E9E9E9
| 405065 ||  || — || September 23, 2001 || Socorro || LINEAR || — || align=right | 1.9 km || 
|-id=066 bgcolor=#E9E9E9
| 405066 ||  || — || October 14, 2001 || Socorro || LINEAR || — || align=right | 1.7 km || 
|-id=067 bgcolor=#fefefe
| 405067 ||  || — || October 14, 2001 || Socorro || LINEAR || — || align=right data-sort-value="0.72" | 720 m || 
|-id=068 bgcolor=#E9E9E9
| 405068 ||  || — || September 17, 2001 || Anderson Mesa || LONEOS || JUN || align=right | 1.3 km || 
|-id=069 bgcolor=#fefefe
| 405069 ||  || — || October 15, 2001 || Palomar || NEAT || — || align=right data-sort-value="0.77" | 770 m || 
|-id=070 bgcolor=#E9E9E9
| 405070 ||  || — || October 10, 2001 || Palomar || NEAT || — || align=right | 2.3 km || 
|-id=071 bgcolor=#E9E9E9
| 405071 ||  || — || October 14, 2001 || Apache Point || SDSS || — || align=right | 1.3 km || 
|-id=072 bgcolor=#FA8072
| 405072 ||  || — || September 20, 2001 || Socorro || LINEAR || — || align=right data-sort-value="0.80" | 800 m || 
|-id=073 bgcolor=#E9E9E9
| 405073 ||  || — || October 17, 2001 || Socorro || LINEAR || — || align=right | 2.1 km || 
|-id=074 bgcolor=#E9E9E9
| 405074 ||  || — || October 15, 2001 || Kitt Peak || Spacewatch || EUN || align=right | 1.1 km || 
|-id=075 bgcolor=#E9E9E9
| 405075 ||  || — || September 20, 2001 || Socorro || LINEAR || EUN || align=right | 1.2 km || 
|-id=076 bgcolor=#E9E9E9
| 405076 ||  || — || October 20, 2001 || Haleakala || NEAT || — || align=right | 2.0 km || 
|-id=077 bgcolor=#E9E9E9
| 405077 ||  || — || October 17, 2001 || Socorro || LINEAR || — || align=right | 1.9 km || 
|-id=078 bgcolor=#E9E9E9
| 405078 ||  || — || October 16, 2001 || Kitt Peak || Spacewatch || — || align=right | 1.2 km || 
|-id=079 bgcolor=#E9E9E9
| 405079 ||  || — || October 20, 2001 || Socorro || LINEAR || — || align=right | 1.6 km || 
|-id=080 bgcolor=#fefefe
| 405080 ||  || — || October 23, 2001 || Socorro || LINEAR || — || align=right data-sort-value="0.65" | 650 m || 
|-id=081 bgcolor=#E9E9E9
| 405081 ||  || — || October 18, 2001 || Palomar || NEAT || — || align=right | 1.5 km || 
|-id=082 bgcolor=#E9E9E9
| 405082 ||  || — || October 14, 2001 || Socorro || LINEAR || — || align=right | 1.8 km || 
|-id=083 bgcolor=#E9E9E9
| 405083 ||  || — || October 20, 2001 || Socorro || LINEAR || — || align=right | 1.8 km || 
|-id=084 bgcolor=#E9E9E9
| 405084 ||  || — || October 26, 2001 || Kitt Peak || Spacewatch || — || align=right | 1.5 km || 
|-id=085 bgcolor=#E9E9E9
| 405085 ||  || — || September 11, 2001 || Kitt Peak || Spacewatch || — || align=right | 1.5 km || 
|-id=086 bgcolor=#E9E9E9
| 405086 ||  || — || November 14, 2001 || Kitt Peak || Spacewatch || WIT || align=right | 1.0 km || 
|-id=087 bgcolor=#E9E9E9
| 405087 ||  || — || October 23, 2001 || Socorro || LINEAR || — || align=right | 2.3 km || 
|-id=088 bgcolor=#fefefe
| 405088 ||  || — || November 17, 2001 || Socorro || LINEAR || — || align=right data-sort-value="0.76" | 760 m || 
|-id=089 bgcolor=#fefefe
| 405089 ||  || — || November 9, 2001 || Socorro || LINEAR || — || align=right data-sort-value="0.89" | 890 m || 
|-id=090 bgcolor=#E9E9E9
| 405090 ||  || — || December 7, 2001 || Kitt Peak || Spacewatch || — || align=right | 1.4 km || 
|-id=091 bgcolor=#E9E9E9
| 405091 ||  || — || October 21, 2001 || Socorro || LINEAR || — || align=right | 1.8 km || 
|-id=092 bgcolor=#E9E9E9
| 405092 ||  || — || December 9, 2001 || Socorro || LINEAR || — || align=right | 2.3 km || 
|-id=093 bgcolor=#E9E9E9
| 405093 ||  || — || December 9, 2001 || Socorro || LINEAR || — || align=right | 2.4 km || 
|-id=094 bgcolor=#E9E9E9
| 405094 ||  || — || November 12, 2001 || Socorro || LINEAR || — || align=right | 3.1 km || 
|-id=095 bgcolor=#E9E9E9
| 405095 ||  || — || November 20, 2001 || Socorro || LINEAR || — || align=right | 2.2 km || 
|-id=096 bgcolor=#E9E9E9
| 405096 ||  || — || December 14, 2001 || Socorro || LINEAR || — || align=right | 2.3 km || 
|-id=097 bgcolor=#E9E9E9
| 405097 ||  || — || December 14, 2001 || Socorro || LINEAR || — || align=right | 3.1 km || 
|-id=098 bgcolor=#E9E9E9
| 405098 ||  || — || December 14, 2001 || Socorro || LINEAR || — || align=right | 2.3 km || 
|-id=099 bgcolor=#E9E9E9
| 405099 ||  || — || November 20, 2001 || Socorro || LINEAR || GAL || align=right | 1.8 km || 
|-id=100 bgcolor=#E9E9E9
| 405100 ||  || — || December 17, 2001 || Socorro || LINEAR || — || align=right | 1.9 km || 
|}

405101–405200 

|-bgcolor=#E9E9E9
| 405101 ||  || — || December 7, 2001 || Kitt Peak || Spacewatch || HOF || align=right | 3.1 km || 
|-id=102 bgcolor=#E9E9E9
| 405102 ||  || — || January 6, 2002 || Kitt Peak || Spacewatch || AEO || align=right | 1.3 km || 
|-id=103 bgcolor=#fefefe
| 405103 ||  || — || December 24, 2001 || Kitt Peak || Spacewatch || — || align=right data-sort-value="0.92" | 920 m || 
|-id=104 bgcolor=#fefefe
| 405104 ||  || — || January 12, 2002 || Kitt Peak || Spacewatch || — || align=right data-sort-value="0.66" | 660 m || 
|-id=105 bgcolor=#FA8072
| 405105 ||  || — || November 27, 2001 || Socorro || LINEAR || — || align=right data-sort-value="0.75" | 750 m || 
|-id=106 bgcolor=#fefefe
| 405106 ||  || — || February 6, 2002 || Socorro || LINEAR || — || align=right data-sort-value="0.87" | 870 m || 
|-id=107 bgcolor=#fefefe
| 405107 ||  || — || February 7, 2002 || Socorro || LINEAR || — || align=right data-sort-value="0.74" | 740 m || 
|-id=108 bgcolor=#fefefe
| 405108 ||  || — || February 7, 2002 || Socorro || LINEAR || PHO || align=right | 1.1 km || 
|-id=109 bgcolor=#fefefe
| 405109 ||  || — || February 13, 2002 || Kitt Peak || Spacewatch || V || align=right data-sort-value="0.49" | 490 m || 
|-id=110 bgcolor=#d6d6d6
| 405110 ||  || — || February 4, 2002 || Anderson Mesa || LONEOS || critical || align=right | 3.5 km || 
|-id=111 bgcolor=#fefefe
| 405111 ||  || — || February 7, 2002 || Palomar || NEAT || — || align=right data-sort-value="0.69" | 690 m || 
|-id=112 bgcolor=#fefefe
| 405112 ||  || — || February 17, 2002 || Palomar || NEAT || H || align=right data-sort-value="0.86" | 860 m || 
|-id=113 bgcolor=#fefefe
| 405113 ||  || — || March 10, 2002 || Cima Ekar || ADAS || — || align=right data-sort-value="0.75" | 750 m || 
|-id=114 bgcolor=#d6d6d6
| 405114 ||  || — || March 13, 2002 || Palomar || NEAT || — || align=right | 2.8 km || 
|-id=115 bgcolor=#fefefe
| 405115 ||  || — || March 4, 2002 || Kitt Peak || Spacewatch || — || align=right data-sort-value="0.90" | 900 m || 
|-id=116 bgcolor=#fefefe
| 405116 ||  || — || March 16, 2002 || Haleakala || NEAT || — || align=right data-sort-value="0.92" | 920 m || 
|-id=117 bgcolor=#fefefe
| 405117 ||  || — || March 19, 2002 || Socorro || LINEAR || — || align=right | 1.1 km || 
|-id=118 bgcolor=#fefefe
| 405118 ||  || — || March 20, 2002 || Socorro || LINEAR || H || align=right data-sort-value="0.92" | 920 m || 
|-id=119 bgcolor=#d6d6d6
| 405119 ||  || — || March 20, 2002 || Socorro || LINEAR || — || align=right | 2.4 km || 
|-id=120 bgcolor=#d6d6d6
| 405120 ||  || — || March 21, 2002 || Kitt Peak || Spacewatch || — || align=right | 2.7 km || 
|-id=121 bgcolor=#fefefe
| 405121 ||  || — || April 6, 2002 || Emerald Lane || L. Ball || — || align=right | 1.3 km || 
|-id=122 bgcolor=#fefefe
| 405122 ||  || — || April 4, 2002 || Palomar || NEAT || — || align=right data-sort-value="0.89" | 890 m || 
|-id=123 bgcolor=#d6d6d6
| 405123 ||  || — || April 9, 2002 || Terskol || Terskol Obs. || — || align=right | 3.4 km || 
|-id=124 bgcolor=#d6d6d6
| 405124 ||  || — || April 5, 2002 || Palomar || NEAT || TIR || align=right | 2.8 km || 
|-id=125 bgcolor=#fefefe
| 405125 ||  || — || April 10, 2002 || Socorro || LINEAR || — || align=right | 1.1 km || 
|-id=126 bgcolor=#d6d6d6
| 405126 ||  || — || April 10, 2002 || Socorro || LINEAR || — || align=right | 3.0 km || 
|-id=127 bgcolor=#fefefe
| 405127 ||  || — || April 12, 2002 || Socorro || LINEAR || — || align=right data-sort-value="0.75" | 750 m || 
|-id=128 bgcolor=#d6d6d6
| 405128 ||  || — || April 14, 2002 || Palomar || NEAT || — || align=right | 3.6 km || 
|-id=129 bgcolor=#FA8072
| 405129 ||  || — || April 19, 2002 || Kitt Peak || Spacewatch || — || align=right data-sort-value="0.63" | 630 m || 
|-id=130 bgcolor=#fefefe
| 405130 ||  || — || May 7, 2002 || Kitt Peak || Spacewatch || — || align=right data-sort-value="0.79" | 790 m || 
|-id=131 bgcolor=#d6d6d6
| 405131 ||  || — || May 7, 2002 || Palomar || NEAT || — || align=right | 3.2 km || 
|-id=132 bgcolor=#d6d6d6
| 405132 ||  || — || May 9, 2002 || Socorro || LINEAR || — || align=right | 2.8 km || 
|-id=133 bgcolor=#d6d6d6
| 405133 ||  || — || June 6, 2002 || Socorro || LINEAR || — || align=right | 6.3 km || 
|-id=134 bgcolor=#d6d6d6
| 405134 ||  || — || August 13, 2002 || Anderson Mesa || LONEOS || THB || align=right | 3.0 km || 
|-id=135 bgcolor=#d6d6d6
| 405135 ||  || — || August 11, 2002 || Palomar || NEAT || — || align=right | 4.5 km || 
|-id=136 bgcolor=#d6d6d6
| 405136 ||  || — || August 8, 2002 || Palomar || NEAT || — || align=right | 2.5 km || 
|-id=137 bgcolor=#E9E9E9
| 405137 ||  || — || August 25, 1998 || Caussols || ODAS || — || align=right | 1.0 km || 
|-id=138 bgcolor=#E9E9E9
| 405138 ||  || — || August 16, 2002 || Palomar || NEAT || — || align=right data-sort-value="0.94" | 940 m || 
|-id=139 bgcolor=#d6d6d6
| 405139 ||  || — || August 29, 2002 || Palomar || NEAT || — || align=right | 5.0 km || 
|-id=140 bgcolor=#d6d6d6
| 405140 ||  || — || August 16, 2002 || Palomar || NEAT || — || align=right | 3.2 km || 
|-id=141 bgcolor=#E9E9E9
| 405141 ||  || — || August 17, 2002 || Palomar || NEAT || — || align=right | 1.1 km || 
|-id=142 bgcolor=#E9E9E9
| 405142 ||  || — || September 14, 2002 || Kitt Peak || Spacewatch || (5) || align=right data-sort-value="0.70" | 700 m || 
|-id=143 bgcolor=#E9E9E9
| 405143 ||  || — || September 11, 2002 || Palomar || NEAT || — || align=right | 1.5 km || 
|-id=144 bgcolor=#E9E9E9
| 405144 ||  || — || September 25, 1998 || Anderson Mesa || LONEOS || EUN || align=right | 1.4 km || 
|-id=145 bgcolor=#E9E9E9
| 405145 ||  || — || September 1, 2002 || Palomar || NEAT || (5) || align=right data-sort-value="0.85" | 850 m || 
|-id=146 bgcolor=#E9E9E9
| 405146 ||  || — || September 15, 2002 || Palomar || NEAT || — || align=right data-sort-value="0.84" | 840 m || 
|-id=147 bgcolor=#E9E9E9
| 405147 ||  || — || September 13, 2002 || Palomar || NEAT || — || align=right data-sort-value="0.71" | 710 m || 
|-id=148 bgcolor=#E9E9E9
| 405148 ||  || — || April 27, 2001 || Kitt Peak || Spacewatch || — || align=right data-sort-value="0.78" | 780 m || 
|-id=149 bgcolor=#E9E9E9
| 405149 ||  || — || September 15, 2002 || Xinglong || SCAP || — || align=right | 1.1 km || 
|-id=150 bgcolor=#E9E9E9
| 405150 ||  || — || September 30, 2002 || Socorro || LINEAR || — || align=right data-sort-value="0.88" | 880 m || 
|-id=151 bgcolor=#E9E9E9
| 405151 ||  || — || September 16, 2002 || Palomar || NEAT || — || align=right | 2.0 km || 
|-id=152 bgcolor=#E9E9E9
| 405152 ||  || — || October 1, 2002 || Anderson Mesa || LONEOS || — || align=right data-sort-value="0.94" | 940 m || 
|-id=153 bgcolor=#E9E9E9
| 405153 ||  || — || October 3, 2002 || Campo Imperatore || CINEOS || — || align=right | 2.0 km || 
|-id=154 bgcolor=#E9E9E9
| 405154 ||  || — || October 5, 2002 || Fountain Hills || C. W. Juels, P. R. Holvorcem || — || align=right data-sort-value="0.78" | 780 m || 
|-id=155 bgcolor=#E9E9E9
| 405155 ||  || — || October 3, 2002 || Palomar || NEAT || — || align=right | 1.4 km || 
|-id=156 bgcolor=#E9E9E9
| 405156 ||  || — || October 5, 2002 || Palomar || NEAT || — || align=right | 1.1 km || 
|-id=157 bgcolor=#E9E9E9
| 405157 ||  || — || October 6, 2002 || Haleakala || NEAT || — || align=right | 2.1 km || 
|-id=158 bgcolor=#E9E9E9
| 405158 ||  || — || October 10, 2002 || Palomar || NEAT || — || align=right data-sort-value="0.78" | 780 m || 
|-id=159 bgcolor=#E9E9E9
| 405159 ||  || — || October 4, 2002 || Apache Point || SDSS || — || align=right data-sort-value="0.90" | 900 m || 
|-id=160 bgcolor=#E9E9E9
| 405160 ||  || — || October 5, 2002 || Apache Point || SDSS || — || align=right | 1.2 km || 
|-id=161 bgcolor=#E9E9E9
| 405161 ||  || — || October 5, 2002 || Apache Point || SDSS || MAR || align=right data-sort-value="0.97" | 970 m || 
|-id=162 bgcolor=#E9E9E9
| 405162 ||  || — || October 10, 2002 || Apache Point || SDSS || — || align=right data-sort-value="0.90" | 900 m || 
|-id=163 bgcolor=#E9E9E9
| 405163 ||  || — || October 30, 2002 || Haleakala || NEAT || — || align=right data-sort-value="0.96" | 960 m || 
|-id=164 bgcolor=#E9E9E9
| 405164 ||  || — || October 31, 2002 || Anderson Mesa || LONEOS || — || align=right data-sort-value="0.86" | 860 m || 
|-id=165 bgcolor=#E9E9E9
| 405165 ||  || — || October 31, 2002 || Anderson Mesa || LONEOS || — || align=right | 1.0 km || 
|-id=166 bgcolor=#E9E9E9
| 405166 ||  || — || March 4, 2000 || Socorro || LINEAR || MAR || align=right | 1.5 km || 
|-id=167 bgcolor=#E9E9E9
| 405167 ||  || — || November 4, 2002 || Palomar || NEAT || — || align=right data-sort-value="0.94" | 940 m || 
|-id=168 bgcolor=#E9E9E9
| 405168 ||  || — || November 5, 2002 || Palomar || NEAT || — || align=right | 1.3 km || 
|-id=169 bgcolor=#E9E9E9
| 405169 ||  || — || November 6, 2002 || Anderson Mesa || LONEOS || (5) || align=right data-sort-value="0.68" | 680 m || 
|-id=170 bgcolor=#E9E9E9
| 405170 ||  || — || November 6, 2002 || Haleakala || NEAT || — || align=right data-sort-value="0.94" | 940 m || 
|-id=171 bgcolor=#E9E9E9
| 405171 ||  || — || October 5, 2002 || Socorro || LINEAR || — || align=right | 1.7 km || 
|-id=172 bgcolor=#E9E9E9
| 405172 ||  || — || November 12, 2002 || Socorro || LINEAR || — || align=right data-sort-value="0.96" | 960 m || 
|-id=173 bgcolor=#E9E9E9
| 405173 ||  || — || November 12, 2002 || Socorro || LINEAR || — || align=right | 1.3 km || 
|-id=174 bgcolor=#E9E9E9
| 405174 ||  || — || November 12, 2002 || Socorro || LINEAR || — || align=right | 1.2 km || 
|-id=175 bgcolor=#E9E9E9
| 405175 ||  || — || November 13, 2002 || Palomar || NEAT || — || align=right data-sort-value="0.85" | 850 m || 
|-id=176 bgcolor=#E9E9E9
| 405176 ||  || — || November 13, 2002 || Palomar || NEAT || — || align=right | 1.3 km || 
|-id=177 bgcolor=#fefefe
| 405177 ||  || — || November 14, 2002 || Palomar || NEAT || H || align=right data-sort-value="0.90" | 900 m || 
|-id=178 bgcolor=#E9E9E9
| 405178 ||  || — || November 5, 2002 || Socorro || LINEAR || — || align=right data-sort-value="0.98" | 980 m || 
|-id=179 bgcolor=#E9E9E9
| 405179 ||  || — || November 23, 2002 || Palomar || NEAT || — || align=right data-sort-value="0.78" | 780 m || 
|-id=180 bgcolor=#E9E9E9
| 405180 ||  || — || November 23, 2002 || Palomar || NEAT || — || align=right data-sort-value="0.86" | 860 m || 
|-id=181 bgcolor=#E9E9E9
| 405181 ||  || — || December 2, 2002 || Haleakala || NEAT || (5) || align=right data-sort-value="0.69" | 690 m || 
|-id=182 bgcolor=#E9E9E9
| 405182 ||  || — || December 10, 2002 || Palomar || NEAT || (5) || align=right data-sort-value="0.69" | 690 m || 
|-id=183 bgcolor=#E9E9E9
| 405183 ||  || — || December 31, 2002 || Kitt Peak || Spacewatch || — || align=right | 1.7 km || 
|-id=184 bgcolor=#E9E9E9
| 405184 ||  || — || January 3, 2003 || Socorro || LINEAR || — || align=right | 1.5 km || 
|-id=185 bgcolor=#E9E9E9
| 405185 ||  || — || January 5, 2003 || Socorro || LINEAR || — || align=right | 1.9 km || 
|-id=186 bgcolor=#E9E9E9
| 405186 ||  || — || January 7, 2003 || Socorro || LINEAR || — || align=right | 1.3 km || 
|-id=187 bgcolor=#E9E9E9
| 405187 ||  || — || January 7, 2003 || Socorro || LINEAR || — || align=right | 2.5 km || 
|-id=188 bgcolor=#E9E9E9
| 405188 ||  || — || January 10, 2003 || Socorro || LINEAR || — || align=right | 2.1 km || 
|-id=189 bgcolor=#FFC2E0
| 405189 ||  || — || January 25, 2003 || Palomar || NEAT || AMO || align=right data-sort-value="0.27" | 270 m || 
|-id=190 bgcolor=#E9E9E9
| 405190 ||  || — || January 25, 2003 || La Silla || A. Boattini, H. Scholl || — || align=right | 1.3 km || 
|-id=191 bgcolor=#E9E9E9
| 405191 ||  || — || January 24, 2003 || La Silla || A. Boattini, H. Scholl || — || align=right | 1.9 km || 
|-id=192 bgcolor=#E9E9E9
| 405192 ||  || — || January 27, 2003 || Socorro || LINEAR || — || align=right | 2.8 km || 
|-id=193 bgcolor=#E9E9E9
| 405193 ||  || — || January 27, 2003 || Socorro || LINEAR || — || align=right | 2.9 km || 
|-id=194 bgcolor=#E9E9E9
| 405194 ||  || — || February 1, 2003 || Palomar || NEAT || — || align=right | 1.8 km || 
|-id=195 bgcolor=#E9E9E9
| 405195 ||  || — || February 8, 2003 || Anderson Mesa || LONEOS || — || align=right | 3.6 km || 
|-id=196 bgcolor=#E9E9E9
| 405196 ||  || — || February 6, 2003 || Socorro || LINEAR || — || align=right | 2.3 km || 
|-id=197 bgcolor=#E9E9E9
| 405197 ||  || — || February 22, 2003 || Palomar || NEAT || — || align=right | 2.9 km || 
|-id=198 bgcolor=#FA8072
| 405198 ||  || — || February 28, 2003 || Socorro || LINEAR || — || align=right | 1.6 km || 
|-id=199 bgcolor=#FA8072
| 405199 ||  || — || February 28, 2003 || Socorro || LINEAR || — || align=right | 1.6 km || 
|-id=200 bgcolor=#FA8072
| 405200 ||  || — || March 11, 2003 || Palomar || NEAT || — || align=right data-sort-value="0.75" | 750 m || 
|}

405201–405300 

|-bgcolor=#FA8072
| 405201 ||  || — || February 26, 2003 || Socorro || LINEAR || H || align=right data-sort-value="0.79" | 790 m || 
|-id=202 bgcolor=#fefefe
| 405202 ||  || — || March 26, 2003 || Palomar || NEAT || H || align=right data-sort-value="0.70" | 700 m || 
|-id=203 bgcolor=#fefefe
| 405203 ||  || — || April 7, 2003 || Desert Eagle || W. K. Y. Yeung || — || align=right data-sort-value="0.59" | 590 m || 
|-id=204 bgcolor=#fefefe
| 405204 ||  || — || April 25, 2003 || Anderson Mesa || LONEOS || — || align=right data-sort-value="0.78" | 780 m || 
|-id=205 bgcolor=#fefefe
| 405205 ||  || — || April 28, 2003 || Anderson Mesa || LONEOS || — || align=right data-sort-value="0.82" | 820 m || 
|-id=206 bgcolor=#E9E9E9
| 405206 ||  || — || April 28, 2003 || Anderson Mesa || LONEOS || — || align=right | 2.9 km || 
|-id=207 bgcolor=#d6d6d6
| 405207 Konstanz ||  ||  || May 24, 2003 || Kleť || KLENOT || — || align=right | 2.9 km || 
|-id=208 bgcolor=#fefefe
| 405208 ||  || — || July 3, 2003 || Kitt Peak || Spacewatch || — || align=right data-sort-value="0.72" | 720 m || 
|-id=209 bgcolor=#fefefe
| 405209 ||  || — || July 23, 2003 || Palomar || NEAT || — || align=right | 2.1 km || 
|-id=210 bgcolor=#fefefe
| 405210 ||  || — || July 27, 2003 || Reedy Creek || J. Broughton || — || align=right data-sort-value="0.91" | 910 m || 
|-id=211 bgcolor=#fefefe
| 405211 ||  || — || August 1, 2003 || Socorro || LINEAR || H || align=right data-sort-value="0.99" | 990 m || 
|-id=212 bgcolor=#FFC2E0
| 405212 ||  || — || August 22, 2003 || Socorro || LINEAR || APO +1kmPHA || align=right data-sort-value="0.88" | 880 m || 
|-id=213 bgcolor=#fefefe
| 405213 ||  || — || August 20, 2003 || Palomar || NEAT || — || align=right data-sort-value="0.76" | 760 m || 
|-id=214 bgcolor=#fefefe
| 405214 ||  || — || August 22, 2003 || Palomar || NEAT || H || align=right data-sort-value="0.70" | 700 m || 
|-id=215 bgcolor=#fefefe
| 405215 ||  || — || August 20, 2003 || Palomar || NEAT || V || align=right data-sort-value="0.82" | 820 m || 
|-id=216 bgcolor=#FA8072
| 405216 ||  || — || August 23, 2003 || Socorro || LINEAR || — || align=right | 1.3 km || 
|-id=217 bgcolor=#d6d6d6
| 405217 ||  || — || August 26, 2003 || Socorro || LINEAR || — || align=right | 3.7 km || 
|-id=218 bgcolor=#d6d6d6
| 405218 ||  || — || August 31, 2003 || Haleakala || NEAT || — || align=right | 4.3 km || 
|-id=219 bgcolor=#fefefe
| 405219 ||  || — || August 22, 2003 || Palomar || NEAT || NYS || align=right data-sort-value="0.79" | 790 m || 
|-id=220 bgcolor=#d6d6d6
| 405220 ||  || — || September 1, 2003 || Socorro || LINEAR || LIX || align=right | 4.1 km || 
|-id=221 bgcolor=#fefefe
| 405221 ||  || — || September 1, 2003 || Socorro || LINEAR || — || align=right data-sort-value="0.81" | 810 m || 
|-id=222 bgcolor=#fefefe
| 405222 ||  || — || August 26, 2003 || Socorro || LINEAR || MAS || align=right data-sort-value="0.79" | 790 m || 
|-id=223 bgcolor=#fefefe
| 405223 ||  || — || September 18, 2003 || Kitt Peak || Spacewatch || NYS || align=right data-sort-value="0.69" | 690 m || 
|-id=224 bgcolor=#d6d6d6
| 405224 ||  || — || September 16, 2003 || Palomar || NEAT || — || align=right | 4.2 km || 
|-id=225 bgcolor=#d6d6d6
| 405225 ||  || — || September 18, 2003 || Socorro || LINEAR || TIR || align=right | 3.1 km || 
|-id=226 bgcolor=#d6d6d6
| 405226 ||  || — || September 17, 2003 || Palomar || NEAT || TIR || align=right | 3.2 km || 
|-id=227 bgcolor=#d6d6d6
| 405227 ||  || — || September 16, 2003 || Anderson Mesa || LONEOS || — || align=right | 4.4 km || 
|-id=228 bgcolor=#d6d6d6
| 405228 ||  || — || September 17, 2003 || Kitt Peak || Spacewatch || — || align=right | 3.5 km || 
|-id=229 bgcolor=#fefefe
| 405229 ||  || — || September 18, 2003 || Socorro || LINEAR || — || align=right | 1.1 km || 
|-id=230 bgcolor=#d6d6d6
| 405230 ||  || — || September 19, 2003 || Kitt Peak || Spacewatch || — || align=right | 3.1 km || 
|-id=231 bgcolor=#d6d6d6
| 405231 ||  || — || September 18, 2003 || Kitt Peak || Spacewatch || — || align=right | 3.3 km || 
|-id=232 bgcolor=#fefefe
| 405232 ||  || — || September 18, 2003 || Socorro || LINEAR || — || align=right data-sort-value="0.86" | 860 m || 
|-id=233 bgcolor=#d6d6d6
| 405233 ||  || — || September 18, 2003 || Campo Imperatore || CINEOS || — || align=right | 4.7 km || 
|-id=234 bgcolor=#fefefe
| 405234 ||  || — || September 16, 2003 || Palomar || NEAT || — || align=right data-sort-value="0.74" | 740 m || 
|-id=235 bgcolor=#d6d6d6
| 405235 ||  || — || September 17, 2003 || Kitt Peak || Spacewatch || — || align=right | 3.0 km || 
|-id=236 bgcolor=#d6d6d6
| 405236 ||  || — || September 17, 2003 || Palomar || NEAT || EUP || align=right | 4.2 km || 
|-id=237 bgcolor=#d6d6d6
| 405237 ||  || — || September 20, 2003 || Socorro || LINEAR || THB || align=right | 2.7 km || 
|-id=238 bgcolor=#d6d6d6
| 405238 ||  || — || September 18, 2003 || Kitt Peak || Spacewatch || — || align=right | 3.7 km || 
|-id=239 bgcolor=#d6d6d6
| 405239 ||  || — || September 19, 2003 || Kitt Peak || Spacewatch || THM || align=right | 2.3 km || 
|-id=240 bgcolor=#d6d6d6
| 405240 ||  || — || September 18, 2003 || Palomar || NEAT || — || align=right | 2.4 km || 
|-id=241 bgcolor=#fefefe
| 405241 ||  || — || September 18, 2003 || Campo Imperatore || CINEOS || V || align=right data-sort-value="0.64" | 640 m || 
|-id=242 bgcolor=#d6d6d6
| 405242 ||  || — || September 19, 2003 || Palomar || NEAT || — || align=right | 2.7 km || 
|-id=243 bgcolor=#d6d6d6
| 405243 ||  || — || September 17, 2003 || Haleakala || NEAT || — || align=right | 3.9 km || 
|-id=244 bgcolor=#fefefe
| 405244 ||  || — || September 19, 2003 || Anderson Mesa || LONEOS || — || align=right | 1.0 km || 
|-id=245 bgcolor=#d6d6d6
| 405245 ||  || — || September 19, 2003 || Palomar || NEAT || — || align=right | 4.7 km || 
|-id=246 bgcolor=#d6d6d6
| 405246 ||  || — || September 22, 2003 || Anderson Mesa || LONEOS || EUP || align=right | 4.9 km || 
|-id=247 bgcolor=#d6d6d6
| 405247 ||  || — || September 22, 2003 || Anderson Mesa || LONEOS || TIR || align=right | 3.0 km || 
|-id=248 bgcolor=#d6d6d6
| 405248 ||  || — || September 22, 2003 || Anderson Mesa || LONEOS || — || align=right | 2.5 km || 
|-id=249 bgcolor=#fefefe
| 405249 ||  || — || September 23, 2003 || Palomar || NEAT || — || align=right | 1.2 km || 
|-id=250 bgcolor=#d6d6d6
| 405250 ||  || — || September 2, 2003 || Socorro || LINEAR || — || align=right | 3.9 km || 
|-id=251 bgcolor=#fefefe
| 405251 ||  || — || September 24, 2003 || Palomar || NEAT || — || align=right data-sort-value="0.86" | 860 m || 
|-id=252 bgcolor=#fefefe
| 405252 ||  || — || September 17, 2003 || Kitt Peak || Spacewatch || — || align=right data-sort-value="0.71" | 710 m || 
|-id=253 bgcolor=#d6d6d6
| 405253 ||  || — || September 26, 2003 || Socorro || LINEAR || — || align=right | 2.9 km || 
|-id=254 bgcolor=#d6d6d6
| 405254 ||  || — || September 28, 2003 || Socorro || LINEAR || — || align=right | 3.7 km || 
|-id=255 bgcolor=#d6d6d6
| 405255 ||  || — || September 28, 2003 || Socorro || LINEAR || — || align=right | 3.7 km || 
|-id=256 bgcolor=#fefefe
| 405256 ||  || — || September 29, 2003 || Socorro || LINEAR || MAS || align=right data-sort-value="0.68" | 680 m || 
|-id=257 bgcolor=#fefefe
| 405257 ||  || — || September 29, 2003 || Socorro || LINEAR || MAS || align=right data-sort-value="0.86" | 860 m || 
|-id=258 bgcolor=#d6d6d6
| 405258 ||  || — || September 29, 2003 || Socorro || LINEAR || — || align=right | 4.4 km || 
|-id=259 bgcolor=#fefefe
| 405259 ||  || — || September 28, 2003 || Goodricke-Pigott || R. A. Tucker || — || align=right | 1.1 km || 
|-id=260 bgcolor=#d6d6d6
| 405260 ||  || — || September 20, 2003 || Kitt Peak || Spacewatch || — || align=right | 3.2 km || 
|-id=261 bgcolor=#d6d6d6
| 405261 ||  || — || September 29, 2003 || Kitt Peak || Spacewatch || — || align=right | 2.4 km || 
|-id=262 bgcolor=#d6d6d6
| 405262 ||  || — || September 28, 2003 || Desert Eagle || W. K. Y. Yeung || HYG || align=right | 2.3 km || 
|-id=263 bgcolor=#d6d6d6
| 405263 ||  || — || September 17, 2003 || Palomar || NEAT || — || align=right | 2.9 km || 
|-id=264 bgcolor=#fefefe
| 405264 ||  || — || September 29, 2003 || Socorro || LINEAR || MAS || align=right data-sort-value="0.64" | 640 m || 
|-id=265 bgcolor=#d6d6d6
| 405265 ||  || — || September 18, 2003 || Kitt Peak || Spacewatch || — || align=right | 3.0 km || 
|-id=266 bgcolor=#d6d6d6
| 405266 ||  || — || September 16, 2003 || Kitt Peak || Spacewatch || — || align=right | 3.3 km || 
|-id=267 bgcolor=#d6d6d6
| 405267 ||  || — || September 17, 2003 || Kitt Peak || Spacewatch || — || align=right | 2.9 km || 
|-id=268 bgcolor=#d6d6d6
| 405268 ||  || — || September 18, 2003 || Palomar || NEAT || HYG || align=right | 2.4 km || 
|-id=269 bgcolor=#fefefe
| 405269 ||  || — || September 18, 2003 || Kitt Peak || Spacewatch || — || align=right data-sort-value="0.69" | 690 m || 
|-id=270 bgcolor=#d6d6d6
| 405270 ||  || — || September 18, 2003 || Kitt Peak || Spacewatch || — || align=right | 2.2 km || 
|-id=271 bgcolor=#d6d6d6
| 405271 ||  || — || September 21, 2003 || Kitt Peak || Spacewatch || THM || align=right | 2.2 km || 
|-id=272 bgcolor=#d6d6d6
| 405272 ||  || — || September 28, 2003 || Kitt Peak || Spacewatch || LIX || align=right | 3.5 km || 
|-id=273 bgcolor=#d6d6d6
| 405273 ||  || — || September 26, 2003 || Apache Point || SDSS || — || align=right | 2.8 km || 
|-id=274 bgcolor=#d6d6d6
| 405274 ||  || — || September 27, 2003 || Apache Point || SDSS || critical || align=right | 2.0 km || 
|-id=275 bgcolor=#d6d6d6
| 405275 ||  || — || September 26, 2003 || Apache Point || SDSS || — || align=right | 3.7 km || 
|-id=276 bgcolor=#d6d6d6
| 405276 ||  || — || September 26, 2003 || Apache Point || SDSS || — || align=right | 2.7 km || 
|-id=277 bgcolor=#d6d6d6
| 405277 ||  || — || September 26, 2003 || Apache Point || SDSS || — || align=right | 3.0 km || 
|-id=278 bgcolor=#d6d6d6
| 405278 ||  || — || September 28, 2003 || Apache Point || SDSS || — || align=right | 3.4 km || 
|-id=279 bgcolor=#d6d6d6
| 405279 ||  || — || September 18, 2003 || Kitt Peak || Spacewatch || — || align=right | 2.6 km || 
|-id=280 bgcolor=#d6d6d6
| 405280 ||  || — || September 16, 2003 || Kitt Peak || Spacewatch || EOS || align=right | 2.3 km || 
|-id=281 bgcolor=#fefefe
| 405281 ||  || — || September 26, 2003 || Apache Point || SDSS || — || align=right data-sort-value="0.81" | 810 m || 
|-id=282 bgcolor=#d6d6d6
| 405282 ||  || — || September 27, 2003 || Kitt Peak || Spacewatch || — || align=right | 3.4 km || 
|-id=283 bgcolor=#d6d6d6
| 405283 ||  || — || September 27, 2003 || Apache Point || SDSS || — || align=right | 1.7 km || 
|-id=284 bgcolor=#d6d6d6
| 405284 ||  || — || September 26, 2003 || Apache Point || SDSS || EOS || align=right | 1.7 km || 
|-id=285 bgcolor=#d6d6d6
| 405285 ||  || — || September 25, 2003 || Mauna Kea || P. A. Wiegert || — || align=right | 3.3 km || 
|-id=286 bgcolor=#d6d6d6
| 405286 ||  || — || September 17, 2003 || Kitt Peak || Spacewatch || (1298) || align=right | 2.9 km || 
|-id=287 bgcolor=#d6d6d6
| 405287 ||  || — || September 28, 2003 || Apache Point || SDSS || — || align=right | 4.3 km || 
|-id=288 bgcolor=#fefefe
| 405288 ||  || — || October 3, 2003 || Kitt Peak || Spacewatch || — || align=right | 1.1 km || 
|-id=289 bgcolor=#d6d6d6
| 405289 ||  || — || October 3, 2003 || Kitt Peak || Spacewatch || LIX || align=right | 6.2 km || 
|-id=290 bgcolor=#d6d6d6
| 405290 ||  || — || October 5, 2003 || Socorro || LINEAR || — || align=right | 2.9 km || 
|-id=291 bgcolor=#d6d6d6
| 405291 ||  || — || October 14, 2003 || Anderson Mesa || LONEOS || — || align=right | 3.3 km || 
|-id=292 bgcolor=#d6d6d6
| 405292 ||  || — || October 15, 2003 || Anderson Mesa || LONEOS || LIX || align=right | 4.8 km || 
|-id=293 bgcolor=#d6d6d6
| 405293 ||  || — || October 14, 2003 || Palomar || NEAT || — || align=right | 3.4 km || 
|-id=294 bgcolor=#fefefe
| 405294 ||  || — || October 15, 2003 || Palomar || NEAT || H || align=right data-sort-value="0.89" | 890 m || 
|-id=295 bgcolor=#d6d6d6
| 405295 ||  || — || October 1, 2003 || Kitt Peak || Spacewatch || — || align=right | 3.3 km || 
|-id=296 bgcolor=#fefefe
| 405296 ||  || — || October 2, 2003 || Kitt Peak || Spacewatch || V || align=right data-sort-value="0.47" | 470 m || 
|-id=297 bgcolor=#d6d6d6
| 405297 ||  || — || October 5, 2003 || Kitt Peak || Spacewatch || — || align=right | 3.0 km || 
|-id=298 bgcolor=#d6d6d6
| 405298 ||  || — || October 5, 2003 || Socorro || LINEAR ||  || align=right | 4.3 km || 
|-id=299 bgcolor=#d6d6d6
| 405299 ||  || — || October 2, 2003 || Kitt Peak || Spacewatch || — || align=right | 2.9 km || 
|-id=300 bgcolor=#d6d6d6
| 405300 ||  || — || October 16, 2003 || Socorro || LINEAR || Tj (2.98) || align=right | 6.3 km || 
|}

405301–405400 

|-bgcolor=#d6d6d6
| 405301 ||  || — || October 18, 2003 || Wrightwood || J. W. Young || LIX || align=right | 4.7 km || 
|-id=302 bgcolor=#d6d6d6
| 405302 ||  || — || August 28, 2003 || Socorro || LINEAR || — || align=right | 3.6 km || 
|-id=303 bgcolor=#fefefe
| 405303 ||  || — || October 16, 2003 || Kitt Peak || Spacewatch || — || align=right data-sort-value="0.71" | 710 m || 
|-id=304 bgcolor=#d6d6d6
| 405304 ||  || — || October 22, 2003 || Kingsnake || J. V. McClusky || — || align=right | 3.6 km || 
|-id=305 bgcolor=#d6d6d6
| 405305 ||  || — || October 22, 2003 || Kingsnake || J. V. McClusky || — || align=right | 3.4 km || 
|-id=306 bgcolor=#d6d6d6
| 405306 ||  || — || October 24, 2003 || Socorro || LINEAR || — || align=right | 3.3 km || 
|-id=307 bgcolor=#d6d6d6
| 405307 ||  || — || September 30, 2003 || Kitt Peak || Spacewatch || — || align=right | 2.9 km || 
|-id=308 bgcolor=#fefefe
| 405308 ||  || — || October 16, 2003 || Kitt Peak || Spacewatch || — || align=right data-sort-value="0.88" | 880 m || 
|-id=309 bgcolor=#d6d6d6
| 405309 ||  || — || October 16, 2003 || Kitt Peak || Spacewatch || VER || align=right | 3.9 km || 
|-id=310 bgcolor=#fefefe
| 405310 ||  || — || September 28, 2003 || Anderson Mesa || LONEOS || — || align=right | 1.0 km || 
|-id=311 bgcolor=#fefefe
| 405311 ||  || — || October 18, 2003 || Socorro || LINEAR || — || align=right data-sort-value="0.97" | 970 m || 
|-id=312 bgcolor=#d6d6d6
| 405312 ||  || — || September 21, 2003 || Kitt Peak || Spacewatch || — || align=right | 2.9 km || 
|-id=313 bgcolor=#fefefe
| 405313 ||  || — || October 17, 2003 || Kitt Peak || Spacewatch || NYS || align=right data-sort-value="0.82" | 820 m || 
|-id=314 bgcolor=#d6d6d6
| 405314 ||  || — || October 19, 2003 || Kitt Peak || Spacewatch || — || align=right | 2.2 km || 
|-id=315 bgcolor=#fefefe
| 405315 ||  || — || October 18, 2003 || Kitt Peak || Spacewatch || — || align=right | 1.3 km || 
|-id=316 bgcolor=#d6d6d6
| 405316 ||  || — || October 19, 2003 || Anderson Mesa || LONEOS || — || align=right | 5.1 km || 
|-id=317 bgcolor=#d6d6d6
| 405317 ||  || — || September 29, 2003 || Socorro || LINEAR || TIR || align=right | 2.9 km || 
|-id=318 bgcolor=#d6d6d6
| 405318 ||  || — || October 18, 2003 || Palomar || NEAT || — || align=right | 4.4 km || 
|-id=319 bgcolor=#fefefe
| 405319 ||  || — || September 28, 2003 || Socorro || LINEAR || NYS || align=right data-sort-value="0.69" | 690 m || 
|-id=320 bgcolor=#fefefe
| 405320 ||  || — || October 21, 2003 || Socorro || LINEAR || NYS || align=right data-sort-value="0.73" | 730 m || 
|-id=321 bgcolor=#d6d6d6
| 405321 ||  || — || October 21, 2003 || Kitt Peak || Spacewatch || EOS || align=right | 2.6 km || 
|-id=322 bgcolor=#fefefe
| 405322 ||  || — || October 21, 2003 || Anderson Mesa || LONEOS || NYS || align=right data-sort-value="0.70" | 700 m || 
|-id=323 bgcolor=#fefefe
| 405323 ||  || — || October 20, 2003 || Kitt Peak || Spacewatch || — || align=right data-sort-value="0.88" | 880 m || 
|-id=324 bgcolor=#d6d6d6
| 405324 ||  || — || October 22, 2003 || Kitt Peak || Spacewatch || HYG || align=right | 3.6 km || 
|-id=325 bgcolor=#fefefe
| 405325 ||  || — || October 22, 2003 || Kitt Peak || Spacewatch || — || align=right data-sort-value="0.80" | 800 m || 
|-id=326 bgcolor=#d6d6d6
| 405326 ||  || — || October 19, 2003 || Kitt Peak || Spacewatch || THM || align=right | 2.0 km || 
|-id=327 bgcolor=#fefefe
| 405327 ||  || — || September 30, 2003 || Kitt Peak || Spacewatch || — || align=right data-sort-value="0.78" | 780 m || 
|-id=328 bgcolor=#fefefe
| 405328 ||  || — || October 24, 2003 || Socorro || LINEAR || — || align=right data-sort-value="0.85" | 850 m || 
|-id=329 bgcolor=#d6d6d6
| 405329 ||  || — || October 25, 2003 || Socorro || LINEAR || — || align=right | 4.0 km || 
|-id=330 bgcolor=#fefefe
| 405330 ||  || — || October 28, 2003 || Socorro || LINEAR || NYS || align=right data-sort-value="0.65" | 650 m || 
|-id=331 bgcolor=#d6d6d6
| 405331 ||  || — || October 29, 2003 || Catalina || CSS || — || align=right | 3.8 km || 
|-id=332 bgcolor=#d6d6d6
| 405332 ||  || — || October 27, 2003 || Kitt Peak || Spacewatch || — || align=right | 4.5 km || 
|-id=333 bgcolor=#d6d6d6
| 405333 ||  || — || September 20, 2003 || Kitt Peak || Spacewatch || VER || align=right | 3.2 km || 
|-id=334 bgcolor=#d6d6d6
| 405334 ||  || — || September 28, 2003 || Kitt Peak || Spacewatch || THM || align=right | 2.2 km || 
|-id=335 bgcolor=#d6d6d6
| 405335 ||  || — || October 17, 2003 || Kitt Peak || Spacewatch || — || align=right | 3.6 km || 
|-id=336 bgcolor=#d6d6d6
| 405336 ||  || — || October 24, 2003 || Socorro || LINEAR || — || align=right | 5.2 km || 
|-id=337 bgcolor=#d6d6d6
| 405337 ||  || — || October 17, 2003 || Apache Point || SDSS || — || align=right | 2.2 km || 
|-id=338 bgcolor=#d6d6d6
| 405338 ||  || — || October 17, 2003 || Apache Point || SDSS || — || align=right | 4.5 km || 
|-id=339 bgcolor=#d6d6d6
| 405339 ||  || — || October 17, 2003 || Apache Point || SDSS || — || align=right | 4.7 km || 
|-id=340 bgcolor=#d6d6d6
| 405340 ||  || — || October 18, 2003 || Apache Point || SDSS || — || align=right | 3.7 km || 
|-id=341 bgcolor=#d6d6d6
| 405341 ||  || — || October 18, 2003 || Apache Point || SDSS || THM || align=right | 1.9 km || 
|-id=342 bgcolor=#d6d6d6
| 405342 ||  || — || October 18, 2003 || Kitt Peak || Spacewatch || THM || align=right | 2.6 km || 
|-id=343 bgcolor=#fefefe
| 405343 ||  || — || October 18, 2003 || Kitt Peak || Spacewatch || — || align=right data-sort-value="0.61" | 610 m || 
|-id=344 bgcolor=#fefefe
| 405344 ||  || — || October 19, 2003 || Apache Point || SDSS || — || align=right data-sort-value="0.81" | 810 m || 
|-id=345 bgcolor=#d6d6d6
| 405345 ||  || — || October 22, 2003 || Kitt Peak || Spacewatch || EOS || align=right | 2.6 km || 
|-id=346 bgcolor=#d6d6d6
| 405346 ||  || — || October 22, 2003 || Apache Point || SDSS || — || align=right | 3.2 km || 
|-id=347 bgcolor=#d6d6d6
| 405347 ||  || — || September 19, 2003 || Kitt Peak || Spacewatch || EOS || align=right | 1.9 km || 
|-id=348 bgcolor=#d6d6d6
| 405348 ||  || — || October 19, 2003 || Kitt Peak || Spacewatch || — || align=right | 2.9 km || 
|-id=349 bgcolor=#fefefe
| 405349 ||  || — || November 15, 2003 || Kitt Peak || Spacewatch || — || align=right data-sort-value="0.82" | 820 m || 
|-id=350 bgcolor=#d6d6d6
| 405350 ||  || — || November 3, 2003 || Socorro || LINEAR || — || align=right | 4.0 km || 
|-id=351 bgcolor=#d6d6d6
| 405351 ||  || — || November 18, 2003 || Kitt Peak || Spacewatch || — || align=right | 3.9 km || 
|-id=352 bgcolor=#FA8072
| 405352 ||  || — || November 16, 2003 || Kitt Peak || Spacewatch || — || align=right data-sort-value="0.90" | 900 m || 
|-id=353 bgcolor=#fefefe
| 405353 ||  || — || November 16, 2003 || Kitt Peak || Spacewatch || V || align=right data-sort-value="0.74" | 740 m || 
|-id=354 bgcolor=#fefefe
| 405354 ||  || — || November 19, 2003 || Kitt Peak || Spacewatch || — || align=right | 1.1 km || 
|-id=355 bgcolor=#fefefe
| 405355 ||  || — || November 21, 2003 || Socorro || LINEAR || H || align=right data-sort-value="0.92" | 920 m || 
|-id=356 bgcolor=#fefefe
| 405356 ||  || — || November 20, 2003 || Socorro || LINEAR || — || align=right data-sort-value="0.91" | 910 m || 
|-id=357 bgcolor=#fefefe
| 405357 ||  || — || November 18, 2003 || Kitt Peak || Spacewatch || NYS || align=right data-sort-value="0.68" | 680 m || 
|-id=358 bgcolor=#fefefe
| 405358 ||  || — || October 24, 2003 || Socorro || LINEAR || — || align=right | 1.0 km || 
|-id=359 bgcolor=#d6d6d6
| 405359 ||  || — || November 19, 2003 || Kitt Peak || Spacewatch || — || align=right | 3.6 km || 
|-id=360 bgcolor=#fefefe
| 405360 ||  || — || November 20, 2003 || Socorro || LINEAR || — || align=right data-sort-value="0.79" | 790 m || 
|-id=361 bgcolor=#d6d6d6
| 405361 ||  || — || November 20, 2003 || Catalina || CSS || LIX || align=right | 3.8 km || 
|-id=362 bgcolor=#fefefe
| 405362 ||  || — || November 20, 2003 || Socorro || LINEAR || — || align=right data-sort-value="0.72" | 720 m || 
|-id=363 bgcolor=#E9E9E9
| 405363 ||  || — || November 20, 2003 || Socorro || LINEAR || — || align=right | 1.2 km || 
|-id=364 bgcolor=#fefefe
| 405364 ||  || — || November 20, 2003 || Socorro || LINEAR || — || align=right | 1.2 km || 
|-id=365 bgcolor=#d6d6d6
| 405365 ||  || — || November 19, 2003 || Kitt Peak || Spacewatch || — || align=right | 3.9 km || 
|-id=366 bgcolor=#fefefe
| 405366 ||  || — || November 26, 2003 || Kitt Peak || Spacewatch || — || align=right data-sort-value="0.74" | 740 m || 
|-id=367 bgcolor=#d6d6d6
| 405367 ||  || — || November 26, 2003 || Anderson Mesa || LONEOS || — || align=right | 5.8 km || 
|-id=368 bgcolor=#d6d6d6
| 405368 ||  || — || December 1, 2003 || Socorro || LINEAR || LIX || align=right | 4.3 km || 
|-id=369 bgcolor=#fefefe
| 405369 ||  || — || December 4, 2003 || Socorro || LINEAR || — || align=right | 1.1 km || 
|-id=370 bgcolor=#fefefe
| 405370 ||  || — || December 17, 2003 || Kitt Peak || Spacewatch || — || align=right data-sort-value="0.91" | 910 m || 
|-id=371 bgcolor=#FA8072
| 405371 ||  || — || December 27, 2003 || Socorro || LINEAR || Tj (2.91) || align=right | 4.6 km || 
|-id=372 bgcolor=#d6d6d6
| 405372 ||  || — || December 29, 2003 || Socorro || LINEAR || — || align=right | 3.3 km || 
|-id=373 bgcolor=#E9E9E9
| 405373 ||  || — || January 15, 2004 || Kitt Peak || Spacewatch || MAR || align=right data-sort-value="0.97" | 970 m || 
|-id=374 bgcolor=#E9E9E9
| 405374 ||  || — || January 18, 2004 || Palomar || NEAT || — || align=right | 1.1 km || 
|-id=375 bgcolor=#E9E9E9
| 405375 ||  || — || January 21, 2004 || Socorro || LINEAR || — || align=right | 1.2 km || 
|-id=376 bgcolor=#E9E9E9
| 405376 ||  || — || January 18, 2004 || Kitt Peak || Spacewatch || — || align=right | 1.1 km || 
|-id=377 bgcolor=#E9E9E9
| 405377 ||  || — || December 27, 2003 || Socorro || LINEAR || — || align=right | 2.2 km || 
|-id=378 bgcolor=#E9E9E9
| 405378 ||  || — || January 16, 2004 || Kitt Peak || Spacewatch || — || align=right data-sort-value="0.86" | 860 m || 
|-id=379 bgcolor=#E9E9E9
| 405379 ||  || — || January 19, 2004 || Kitt Peak || Spacewatch || — || align=right data-sort-value="0.90" | 900 m || 
|-id=380 bgcolor=#E9E9E9
| 405380 ||  || — || January 19, 2004 || Kitt Peak || Spacewatch || MAR || align=right | 1.3 km || 
|-id=381 bgcolor=#E9E9E9
| 405381 ||  || — || January 20, 2004 || Cerro Paranal || Paranal Obs. || — || align=right | 1.3 km || 
|-id=382 bgcolor=#E9E9E9
| 405382 ||  || — || February 11, 2004 || Kitt Peak || Spacewatch || EUN || align=right | 1.2 km || 
|-id=383 bgcolor=#E9E9E9
| 405383 ||  || — || February 11, 2004 || Palomar || NEAT || — || align=right | 1.2 km || 
|-id=384 bgcolor=#E9E9E9
| 405384 ||  || — || February 26, 2004 || Kitt Peak || M. W. Buie || — || align=right | 1.3 km || 
|-id=385 bgcolor=#E9E9E9
| 405385 ||  || — || February 26, 2004 || Socorro || LINEAR || EUN || align=right | 1.3 km || 
|-id=386 bgcolor=#E9E9E9
| 405386 ||  || — || March 14, 2004 || Catalina || CSS || EUN || align=right | 1.4 km || 
|-id=387 bgcolor=#E9E9E9
| 405387 ||  || — || March 13, 2004 || Palomar || NEAT || — || align=right | 2.1 km || 
|-id=388 bgcolor=#E9E9E9
| 405388 ||  || — || March 15, 2004 || Kitt Peak || Spacewatch || — || align=right | 1.7 km || 
|-id=389 bgcolor=#E9E9E9
| 405389 ||  || — || March 15, 2004 || Kitt Peak || Spacewatch || EUN || align=right | 1.2 km || 
|-id=390 bgcolor=#fefefe
| 405390 ||  || — || March 20, 2004 || Socorro || LINEAR || — || align=right data-sort-value="0.69" | 690 m || 
|-id=391 bgcolor=#E9E9E9
| 405391 ||  || — || March 17, 2004 || Kitt Peak || Spacewatch || — || align=right data-sort-value="0.75" | 750 m || 
|-id=392 bgcolor=#E9E9E9
| 405392 ||  || — || March 17, 2004 || Kitt Peak || Spacewatch || — || align=right | 1.0 km || 
|-id=393 bgcolor=#E9E9E9
| 405393 ||  || — || April 13, 2004 || Palomar || NEAT || — || align=right | 2.1 km || 
|-id=394 bgcolor=#E9E9E9
| 405394 ||  || — || April 16, 2004 || Socorro || LINEAR || — || align=right | 1.8 km || 
|-id=395 bgcolor=#E9E9E9
| 405395 ||  || — || April 19, 2004 || Kitt Peak || Spacewatch || — || align=right | 3.1 km || 
|-id=396 bgcolor=#E9E9E9
| 405396 ||  || — || May 11, 2004 || Anderson Mesa || LONEOS || EUN || align=right | 1.7 km || 
|-id=397 bgcolor=#FA8072
| 405397 ||  || — || June 15, 2004 || Socorro || LINEAR || — || align=right data-sort-value="0.52" | 520 m || 
|-id=398 bgcolor=#FA8072
| 405398 ||  || — || June 14, 2004 || Kitt Peak || Spacewatch || — || align=right data-sort-value="0.57" | 570 m || 
|-id=399 bgcolor=#FA8072
| 405399 ||  || — || July 16, 2004 || Socorro || LINEAR || — || align=right data-sort-value="0.68" | 680 m || 
|-id=400 bgcolor=#d6d6d6
| 405400 ||  || — || August 6, 2004 || Palomar || NEAT || — || align=right | 2.3 km || 
|}

405401–405500 

|-bgcolor=#FA8072
| 405401 ||  || — || August 8, 2004 || Anderson Mesa || LONEOS || — || align=right | 1.5 km || 
|-id=402 bgcolor=#d6d6d6
| 405402 ||  || — || August 8, 2004 || Anderson Mesa || LONEOS || — || align=right | 2.5 km || 
|-id=403 bgcolor=#FA8072
| 405403 ||  || — || August 8, 2004 || Socorro || LINEAR || — || align=right data-sort-value="0.74" | 740 m || 
|-id=404 bgcolor=#fefefe
| 405404 ||  || — || August 9, 2004 || Socorro || LINEAR || — || align=right data-sort-value="0.67" | 670 m || 
|-id=405 bgcolor=#d6d6d6
| 405405 ||  || — || August 11, 2004 || Socorro || LINEAR || — || align=right | 1.9 km || 
|-id=406 bgcolor=#fefefe
| 405406 ||  || — || September 7, 2004 || Kitt Peak || Spacewatch || — || align=right data-sort-value="0.70" | 700 m || 
|-id=407 bgcolor=#fefefe
| 405407 ||  || — || August 26, 2004 || Catalina || CSS || — || align=right data-sort-value="0.64" | 640 m || 
|-id=408 bgcolor=#fefefe
| 405408 ||  || — || August 12, 2004 || Socorro || LINEAR || — || align=right data-sort-value="0.75" | 750 m || 
|-id=409 bgcolor=#fefefe
| 405409 ||  || — || September 8, 2004 || Socorro || LINEAR || — || align=right data-sort-value="0.89" | 890 m || 
|-id=410 bgcolor=#fefefe
| 405410 ||  || — || September 8, 2004 || Socorro || LINEAR || — || align=right data-sort-value="0.80" | 800 m || 
|-id=411 bgcolor=#fefefe
| 405411 ||  || — || September 8, 2004 || Socorro || LINEAR || — || align=right data-sort-value="0.76" | 760 m || 
|-id=412 bgcolor=#fefefe
| 405412 ||  || — || August 23, 2004 || Kitt Peak || Spacewatch || — || align=right data-sort-value="0.77" | 770 m || 
|-id=413 bgcolor=#d6d6d6
| 405413 ||  || — || September 7, 2004 || Kitt Peak || Spacewatch || — || align=right | 2.5 km || 
|-id=414 bgcolor=#fefefe
| 405414 ||  || — || August 23, 2004 || Kitt Peak || Spacewatch || H || align=right data-sort-value="0.58" | 580 m || 
|-id=415 bgcolor=#d6d6d6
| 405415 ||  || — || September 11, 2004 || Socorro || LINEAR || — || align=right | 3.9 km || 
|-id=416 bgcolor=#fefefe
| 405416 ||  || — || September 9, 2004 || Socorro || LINEAR || — || align=right data-sort-value="0.75" | 750 m || 
|-id=417 bgcolor=#fefefe
| 405417 ||  || — || September 10, 2004 || Socorro || LINEAR || — || align=right data-sort-value="0.81" | 810 m || 
|-id=418 bgcolor=#d6d6d6
| 405418 ||  || — || September 12, 2004 || Kitt Peak || Spacewatch || EOS || align=right | 2.2 km || 
|-id=419 bgcolor=#d6d6d6
| 405419 ||  || — || September 11, 2004 || Socorro || LINEAR || — || align=right | 3.8 km || 
|-id=420 bgcolor=#fefefe
| 405420 ||  || — || September 10, 2004 || Kitt Peak || Spacewatch || — || align=right data-sort-value="0.73" | 730 m || 
|-id=421 bgcolor=#FA8072
| 405421 ||  || — || September 13, 2004 || Socorro || LINEAR || — || align=right data-sort-value="0.81" | 810 m || 
|-id=422 bgcolor=#d6d6d6
| 405422 ||  || — || September 13, 2004 || Socorro || LINEAR || — || align=right | 2.8 km || 
|-id=423 bgcolor=#d6d6d6
| 405423 ||  || — || September 13, 2004 || Anderson Mesa || LONEOS || — || align=right | 2.5 km || 
|-id=424 bgcolor=#fefefe
| 405424 ||  || — || September 15, 2004 || Kitt Peak || Spacewatch || — || align=right data-sort-value="0.56" | 560 m || 
|-id=425 bgcolor=#fefefe
| 405425 ||  || — || September 7, 2004 || Kitt Peak || Spacewatch || — || align=right data-sort-value="0.83" | 830 m || 
|-id=426 bgcolor=#d6d6d6
| 405426 ||  || — || September 16, 2004 || Jarnac || Jarnac Obs. || — || align=right | 3.6 km || 
|-id=427 bgcolor=#FFC2E0
| 405427 ||  || — || September 17, 2004 || Kitt Peak || Spacewatch || AMO +1km || align=right data-sort-value="0.88" | 880 m || 
|-id=428 bgcolor=#d6d6d6
| 405428 ||  || — || September 17, 2004 || Kitt Peak || Spacewatch || — || align=right | 2.9 km || 
|-id=429 bgcolor=#fefefe
| 405429 ||  || — || August 25, 2004 || Kitt Peak || Spacewatch || — || align=right data-sort-value="0.54" | 540 m || 
|-id=430 bgcolor=#d6d6d6
| 405430 ||  || — || September 21, 2004 || Socorro || LINEAR || — || align=right | 2.4 km || 
|-id=431 bgcolor=#fefefe
| 405431 ||  || — || September 21, 2004 || Socorro || LINEAR || — || align=right data-sort-value="0.80" | 800 m || 
|-id=432 bgcolor=#fefefe
| 405432 ||  || — || October 4, 2004 || Kitt Peak || Spacewatch || — || align=right data-sort-value="0.72" | 720 m || 
|-id=433 bgcolor=#d6d6d6
| 405433 ||  || — || October 4, 2004 || Kitt Peak || Spacewatch || — || align=right | 1.5 km || 
|-id=434 bgcolor=#d6d6d6
| 405434 ||  || — || October 4, 2004 || Kitt Peak || Spacewatch || — || align=right | 3.4 km || 
|-id=435 bgcolor=#fefefe
| 405435 ||  || — || October 4, 2004 || Kitt Peak || Spacewatch || — || align=right data-sort-value="0.61" | 610 m || 
|-id=436 bgcolor=#fefefe
| 405436 ||  || — || October 4, 2004 || Kitt Peak || Spacewatch || — || align=right data-sort-value="0.69" | 690 m || 
|-id=437 bgcolor=#d6d6d6
| 405437 ||  || — || October 4, 2004 || Kitt Peak || Spacewatch || — || align=right | 3.2 km || 
|-id=438 bgcolor=#d6d6d6
| 405438 ||  || — || October 5, 2004 || Kitt Peak || Spacewatch || — || align=right | 2.4 km || 
|-id=439 bgcolor=#d6d6d6
| 405439 ||  || — || October 5, 2004 || Kitt Peak || Spacewatch || — || align=right | 3.0 km || 
|-id=440 bgcolor=#d6d6d6
| 405440 ||  || — || October 4, 2004 || Socorro || LINEAR || — || align=right | 3.5 km || 
|-id=441 bgcolor=#d6d6d6
| 405441 ||  || — || October 5, 2004 || Kitt Peak || Spacewatch || — || align=right | 2.3 km || 
|-id=442 bgcolor=#d6d6d6
| 405442 ||  || — || October 5, 2004 || Kitt Peak || Spacewatch || — || align=right | 2.4 km || 
|-id=443 bgcolor=#d6d6d6
| 405443 ||  || — || October 5, 2004 || Kitt Peak || Spacewatch || — || align=right | 2.5 km || 
|-id=444 bgcolor=#fefefe
| 405444 ||  || — || October 5, 2004 || Kitt Peak || Spacewatch || — || align=right data-sort-value="0.63" | 630 m || 
|-id=445 bgcolor=#fefefe
| 405445 ||  || — || October 5, 2004 || Kitt Peak || Spacewatch || — || align=right data-sort-value="0.80" | 800 m || 
|-id=446 bgcolor=#d6d6d6
| 405446 ||  || — || October 5, 2004 || Kitt Peak || Spacewatch || EOS || align=right | 1.9 km || 
|-id=447 bgcolor=#fefefe
| 405447 ||  || — || September 7, 2004 || Kitt Peak || Spacewatch || — || align=right data-sort-value="0.70" | 700 m || 
|-id=448 bgcolor=#d6d6d6
| 405448 ||  || — || October 5, 2004 || Kitt Peak || Spacewatch || — || align=right | 2.5 km || 
|-id=449 bgcolor=#d6d6d6
| 405449 ||  || — || October 7, 2004 || Palomar || NEAT || — || align=right | 4.2 km || 
|-id=450 bgcolor=#d6d6d6
| 405450 ||  || — || September 10, 2004 || Kitt Peak || Spacewatch || — || align=right | 2.7 km || 
|-id=451 bgcolor=#fefefe
| 405451 ||  || — || October 9, 2004 || Socorro || LINEAR || — || align=right data-sort-value="0.91" | 910 m || 
|-id=452 bgcolor=#fefefe
| 405452 ||  || — || October 7, 2004 || Kitt Peak || Spacewatch || — || align=right data-sort-value="0.89" | 890 m || 
|-id=453 bgcolor=#d6d6d6
| 405453 ||  || — || October 7, 2004 || Kitt Peak || Spacewatch || — || align=right | 3.3 km || 
|-id=454 bgcolor=#d6d6d6
| 405454 ||  || — || October 7, 2004 || Socorro || LINEAR || — || align=right | 2.5 km || 
|-id=455 bgcolor=#fefefe
| 405455 ||  || — || October 9, 2004 || Kitt Peak || Spacewatch || — || align=right data-sort-value="0.64" | 640 m || 
|-id=456 bgcolor=#fefefe
| 405456 ||  || — || August 26, 2004 || Catalina || CSS || — || align=right data-sort-value="0.72" | 720 m || 
|-id=457 bgcolor=#d6d6d6
| 405457 ||  || — || October 7, 2004 || Kitt Peak || Spacewatch || — || align=right | 2.3 km || 
|-id=458 bgcolor=#d6d6d6
| 405458 ||  || — || October 9, 2004 || Kitt Peak || Spacewatch || — || align=right | 3.3 km || 
|-id=459 bgcolor=#d6d6d6
| 405459 ||  || — || October 9, 2004 || Kitt Peak || Spacewatch || EOS || align=right | 1.9 km || 
|-id=460 bgcolor=#d6d6d6
| 405460 ||  || — || October 9, 2004 || Kitt Peak || Spacewatch || — || align=right | 1.9 km || 
|-id=461 bgcolor=#d6d6d6
| 405461 ||  || — || October 9, 2004 || Kitt Peak || Spacewatch || — || align=right | 3.2 km || 
|-id=462 bgcolor=#d6d6d6
| 405462 ||  || — || October 10, 2004 || Kitt Peak || Spacewatch || — || align=right | 1.7 km || 
|-id=463 bgcolor=#d6d6d6
| 405463 ||  || — || October 12, 2004 || Kitt Peak || Spacewatch || EOS || align=right | 2.0 km || 
|-id=464 bgcolor=#fefefe
| 405464 ||  || — || October 12, 2004 || Kitt Peak || Spacewatch || — || align=right data-sort-value="0.75" | 750 m || 
|-id=465 bgcolor=#d6d6d6
| 405465 ||  || — || October 10, 2004 || Kitt Peak || Spacewatch || KOR || align=right | 1.3 km || 
|-id=466 bgcolor=#d6d6d6
| 405466 ||  || — || October 5, 2004 || Palomar || NEAT || EOS || align=right | 2.8 km || 
|-id=467 bgcolor=#fefefe
| 405467 ||  || — || November 4, 2004 || Socorro || LINEAR || — || align=right | 1.0 km || 
|-id=468 bgcolor=#d6d6d6
| 405468 ||  || — || October 7, 2004 || Anderson Mesa || LONEOS || — || align=right | 3.7 km || 
|-id=469 bgcolor=#d6d6d6
| 405469 ||  || — || November 5, 2004 || Palomar || NEAT || — || align=right | 2.6 km || 
|-id=470 bgcolor=#d6d6d6
| 405470 ||  || — || November 3, 2004 || Kitt Peak || Spacewatch || EOS || align=right | 1.8 km || 
|-id=471 bgcolor=#FA8072
| 405471 ||  || — || November 4, 2004 || Kitt Peak || Spacewatch || — || align=right data-sort-value="0.75" | 750 m || 
|-id=472 bgcolor=#fefefe
| 405472 ||  || — || November 7, 2004 || Socorro || LINEAR || — || align=right data-sort-value="0.99" | 990 m || 
|-id=473 bgcolor=#d6d6d6
| 405473 ||  || — || November 10, 2004 || Kitt Peak || Spacewatch || — || align=right | 2.6 km || 
|-id=474 bgcolor=#fefefe
| 405474 ||  || — || November 3, 2004 || Socorro || LINEAR || PHO || align=right | 1.2 km || 
|-id=475 bgcolor=#d6d6d6
| 405475 ||  || — || October 14, 1998 || Kitt Peak || Spacewatch || — || align=right | 3.3 km || 
|-id=476 bgcolor=#d6d6d6
| 405476 ||  || — || November 9, 2004 || Catalina || CSS || — || align=right | 2.8 km || 
|-id=477 bgcolor=#fefefe
| 405477 || 2004 WE || — || November 17, 2004 || Siding Spring || SSS || — || align=right data-sort-value="0.68" | 680 m || 
|-id=478 bgcolor=#fefefe
| 405478 ||  || — || November 4, 2004 || Catalina || CSS || — || align=right data-sort-value="0.58" | 580 m || 
|-id=479 bgcolor=#d6d6d6
| 405479 ||  || — || December 1, 2004 || Palomar || NEAT || — || align=right | 4.2 km || 
|-id=480 bgcolor=#d6d6d6
| 405480 ||  || — || December 1, 2004 || Palomar || NEAT || — || align=right | 3.1 km || 
|-id=481 bgcolor=#d6d6d6
| 405481 ||  || — || December 1, 2004 || Palomar || NEAT || — || align=right | 4.8 km || 
|-id=482 bgcolor=#d6d6d6
| 405482 ||  || — || December 2, 2004 || Catalina || CSS || — || align=right | 2.5 km || 
|-id=483 bgcolor=#d6d6d6
| 405483 ||  || — || December 2, 2004 || Socorro || LINEAR || — || align=right | 2.8 km || 
|-id=484 bgcolor=#fefefe
| 405484 ||  || — || December 3, 2004 || Kitt Peak || Spacewatch || — || align=right | 1.7 km || 
|-id=485 bgcolor=#d6d6d6
| 405485 ||  || — || December 3, 2004 || Kitt Peak || Spacewatch || — || align=right | 6.1 km || 
|-id=486 bgcolor=#fefefe
| 405486 ||  || — || December 8, 2004 || Socorro || LINEAR || — || align=right data-sort-value="0.87" | 870 m || 
|-id=487 bgcolor=#d6d6d6
| 405487 ||  || — || December 3, 2004 || Kitt Peak || Spacewatch || — || align=right | 2.7 km || 
|-id=488 bgcolor=#fefefe
| 405488 ||  || — || November 3, 2004 || Kitt Peak || Spacewatch || — || align=right data-sort-value="0.87" | 870 m || 
|-id=489 bgcolor=#d6d6d6
| 405489 ||  || — || December 11, 2004 || Kitt Peak || Spacewatch || — || align=right | 2.2 km || 
|-id=490 bgcolor=#d6d6d6
| 405490 ||  || — || November 4, 2004 || Kitt Peak || Spacewatch || — || align=right | 2.9 km || 
|-id=491 bgcolor=#d6d6d6
| 405491 ||  || — || December 14, 2004 || Catalina || CSS || THB || align=right | 4.1 km || 
|-id=492 bgcolor=#d6d6d6
| 405492 ||  || — || December 9, 2004 || Kitt Peak || Spacewatch || — || align=right | 3.0 km || 
|-id=493 bgcolor=#d6d6d6
| 405493 ||  || — || December 11, 2004 || Socorro || LINEAR || — || align=right | 4.4 km || 
|-id=494 bgcolor=#fefefe
| 405494 ||  || — || December 2, 2004 || Kitt Peak || Spacewatch || — || align=right data-sort-value="0.64" | 640 m || 
|-id=495 bgcolor=#d6d6d6
| 405495 ||  || — || December 15, 2004 || Kitt Peak || Spacewatch || — || align=right | 3.9 km || 
|-id=496 bgcolor=#fefefe
| 405496 ||  || — || December 1, 2004 || Catalina || CSS || — || align=right | 1.1 km || 
|-id=497 bgcolor=#d6d6d6
| 405497 ||  || — || December 11, 2004 || Catalina || CSS || — || align=right | 1.9 km || 
|-id=498 bgcolor=#d6d6d6
| 405498 ||  || — || December 2, 2004 || Kitt Peak || Spacewatch || — || align=right | 2.5 km || 
|-id=499 bgcolor=#fefefe
| 405499 ||  || — || January 6, 2005 || Socorro || LINEAR || NYS || align=right data-sort-value="0.80" | 800 m || 
|-id=500 bgcolor=#fefefe
| 405500 ||  || — || January 7, 2005 || Kitt Peak || Spacewatch || NYS || align=right data-sort-value="0.52" | 520 m || 
|}

405501–405600 

|-bgcolor=#d6d6d6
| 405501 ||  || — || January 11, 2005 || Socorro || LINEAR || — || align=right | 2.6 km || 
|-id=502 bgcolor=#d6d6d6
| 405502 ||  || — || January 15, 2005 || Anderson Mesa || LONEOS || TIR || align=right | 3.1 km || 
|-id=503 bgcolor=#fefefe
| 405503 ||  || — || January 15, 2005 || Socorro || LINEAR || — || align=right data-sort-value="0.96" | 960 m || 
|-id=504 bgcolor=#d6d6d6
| 405504 ||  || — || January 13, 2005 || Kitt Peak || Spacewatch || — || align=right | 3.0 km || 
|-id=505 bgcolor=#fefefe
| 405505 ||  || — || January 15, 2005 || Kitt Peak || Spacewatch || — || align=right data-sort-value="0.95" | 950 m || 
|-id=506 bgcolor=#fefefe
| 405506 ||  || — || January 13, 2005 || Kitt Peak || Spacewatch || — || align=right data-sort-value="0.78" | 780 m || 
|-id=507 bgcolor=#fefefe
| 405507 ||  || — || January 13, 2005 || Kitt Peak || Spacewatch || — || align=right | 1.1 km || 
|-id=508 bgcolor=#FA8072
| 405508 ||  || — || January 16, 2005 || Anderson Mesa || LONEOS || — || align=right | 1.5 km || 
|-id=509 bgcolor=#d6d6d6
| 405509 ||  || — || January 16, 2005 || Socorro || LINEAR || — || align=right | 3.5 km || 
|-id=510 bgcolor=#d6d6d6
| 405510 ||  || — || January 16, 2005 || Socorro || LINEAR || — || align=right | 2.2 km || 
|-id=511 bgcolor=#fefefe
| 405511 ||  || — || January 17, 2005 || Catalina || CSS || H || align=right data-sort-value="0.85" | 850 m || 
|-id=512 bgcolor=#fefefe
| 405512 ||  || — || December 21, 2004 || Catalina || CSS || H || align=right data-sort-value="0.99" | 990 m || 
|-id=513 bgcolor=#d6d6d6
| 405513 ||  || — || February 2, 2005 || Socorro || LINEAR || — || align=right | 3.4 km || 
|-id=514 bgcolor=#fefefe
| 405514 ||  || — || February 9, 2005 || La Silla || A. Boattini, H. Scholl || — || align=right data-sort-value="0.90" | 900 m || 
|-id=515 bgcolor=#fefefe
| 405515 ||  || — || February 2, 2005 || Kitt Peak || Spacewatch || NYS || align=right data-sort-value="0.67" | 670 m || 
|-id=516 bgcolor=#fefefe
| 405516 ||  || — || February 2, 2005 || Catalina || CSS || — || align=right | 1.3 km || 
|-id=517 bgcolor=#fefefe
| 405517 ||  || — || February 9, 2005 || Kitt Peak || Spacewatch || H || align=right data-sort-value="0.64" | 640 m || 
|-id=518 bgcolor=#d6d6d6
| 405518 ||  || — || February 15, 2005 || Gnosca || S. Sposetti || — || align=right | 2.9 km || 
|-id=519 bgcolor=#d6d6d6
| 405519 ||  || — || February 1, 2005 || Catalina || CSS || — || align=right | 5.3 km || 
|-id=520 bgcolor=#fefefe
| 405520 ||  || — || March 1, 2005 || Kitt Peak || Spacewatch || — || align=right data-sort-value="0.78" | 780 m || 
|-id=521 bgcolor=#fefefe
| 405521 ||  || — || March 3, 2005 || Kitt Peak || Spacewatch || H || align=right data-sort-value="0.95" | 950 m || 
|-id=522 bgcolor=#fefefe
| 405522 ||  || — || March 4, 2005 || Kitt Peak || Spacewatch || — || align=right data-sort-value="0.82" | 820 m || 
|-id=523 bgcolor=#fefefe
| 405523 ||  || — || March 4, 2005 || Catalina || CSS || — || align=right data-sort-value="0.83" | 830 m || 
|-id=524 bgcolor=#d6d6d6
| 405524 ||  || — || March 4, 2005 || Socorro || LINEAR || LIX || align=right | 3.8 km || 
|-id=525 bgcolor=#fefefe
| 405525 ||  || — || March 8, 2005 || Socorro || LINEAR || H || align=right data-sort-value="0.77" | 770 m || 
|-id=526 bgcolor=#fefefe
| 405526 ||  || — || March 4, 2005 || Mount Lemmon || Mount Lemmon Survey || — || align=right data-sort-value="0.79" | 790 m || 
|-id=527 bgcolor=#fefefe
| 405527 ||  || — || March 9, 2005 || Mount Lemmon || Mount Lemmon Survey || H || align=right data-sort-value="0.48" | 480 m || 
|-id=528 bgcolor=#fefefe
| 405528 ||  || — || March 9, 2005 || Catalina || CSS || — || align=right | 1.2 km || 
|-id=529 bgcolor=#E9E9E9
| 405529 ||  || — || February 14, 2005 || Kitt Peak || Spacewatch || — || align=right data-sort-value="0.90" | 900 m || 
|-id=530 bgcolor=#d6d6d6
| 405530 ||  || — || March 9, 2005 || Mount Lemmon || Mount Lemmon Survey || — || align=right | 2.4 km || 
|-id=531 bgcolor=#fefefe
| 405531 ||  || — || March 11, 2005 || Mount Lemmon || Mount Lemmon Survey || — || align=right data-sort-value="0.88" | 880 m || 
|-id=532 bgcolor=#d6d6d6
| 405532 ||  || — || March 7, 2005 || Socorro || LINEAR || Tj (2.99) || align=right | 3.3 km || 
|-id=533 bgcolor=#fefefe
| 405533 ||  || — || March 11, 2005 || Mount Lemmon || Mount Lemmon Survey || NYS || align=right data-sort-value="0.66" | 660 m || 
|-id=534 bgcolor=#d6d6d6
| 405534 ||  || — || March 15, 2005 || Catalina || CSS || Tj (2.98) || align=right | 3.4 km || 
|-id=535 bgcolor=#fefefe
| 405535 ||  || — || March 10, 2005 || Mount Lemmon || Mount Lemmon Survey || — || align=right data-sort-value="0.76" | 760 m || 
|-id=536 bgcolor=#fefefe
| 405536 ||  || — || March 10, 2005 || Mount Lemmon || Mount Lemmon Survey || — || align=right data-sort-value="0.67" | 670 m || 
|-id=537 bgcolor=#fefefe
| 405537 ||  || — || March 4, 2005 || Mount Lemmon || Mount Lemmon Survey || — || align=right data-sort-value="0.63" | 630 m || 
|-id=538 bgcolor=#E9E9E9
| 405538 ||  || — || April 1, 2005 || Kitt Peak || Spacewatch || — || align=right data-sort-value="0.79" | 790 m || 
|-id=539 bgcolor=#fefefe
| 405539 ||  || — || April 4, 2005 || Kitt Peak || Spacewatch || — || align=right | 1.1 km || 
|-id=540 bgcolor=#E9E9E9
| 405540 ||  || — || April 4, 2005 || Kitt Peak || Spacewatch || — || align=right data-sort-value="0.77" | 770 m || 
|-id=541 bgcolor=#fefefe
| 405541 ||  || — || April 5, 2005 || Palomar || NEAT || NYS || align=right data-sort-value="0.83" | 830 m || 
|-id=542 bgcolor=#E9E9E9
| 405542 ||  || — || April 5, 2005 || Mount Lemmon || Mount Lemmon Survey || — || align=right data-sort-value="0.83" | 830 m || 
|-id=543 bgcolor=#fefefe
| 405543 ||  || — || April 7, 2005 || Kitt Peak || Spacewatch || — || align=right data-sort-value="0.92" | 920 m || 
|-id=544 bgcolor=#fefefe
| 405544 ||  || — || April 7, 2005 || Kitt Peak || Spacewatch || NYS || align=right data-sort-value="0.62" | 620 m || 
|-id=545 bgcolor=#E9E9E9
| 405545 ||  || — || April 6, 2005 || Catalina || CSS || — || align=right | 1.1 km || 
|-id=546 bgcolor=#E9E9E9
| 405546 ||  || — || May 6, 2005 || Catalina || CSS || — || align=right data-sort-value="0.97" | 970 m || 
|-id=547 bgcolor=#E9E9E9
| 405547 ||  || — || May 4, 2005 || Kitt Peak || Spacewatch || — || align=right | 1.0 km || 
|-id=548 bgcolor=#E9E9E9
| 405548 ||  || — || April 11, 2005 || Kitt Peak || Spacewatch || — || align=right data-sort-value="0.95" | 950 m || 
|-id=549 bgcolor=#E9E9E9
| 405549 ||  || — || May 10, 2005 || Kitt Peak || Spacewatch || — || align=right | 1.7 km || 
|-id=550 bgcolor=#E9E9E9
| 405550 ||  || — || May 14, 2005 || Kitt Peak || Spacewatch || — || align=right | 1.4 km || 
|-id=551 bgcolor=#E9E9E9
| 405551 ||  || — || May 11, 2005 || Palomar || NEAT || — || align=right | 3.1 km || 
|-id=552 bgcolor=#E9E9E9
| 405552 ||  || — || May 18, 2005 || Palomar || NEAT || EUN || align=right | 1.2 km || 
|-id=553 bgcolor=#E9E9E9
| 405553 ||  || — || June 2, 2005 || Siding Spring || SSS || — || align=right | 1.8 km || 
|-id=554 bgcolor=#E9E9E9
| 405554 ||  || — || June 1, 2005 || Kitt Peak || Spacewatch || — || align=right | 1.2 km || 
|-id=555 bgcolor=#fefefe
| 405555 ||  || — || May 20, 2005 || Mount Lemmon || Mount Lemmon Survey || — || align=right data-sort-value="0.87" | 870 m || 
|-id=556 bgcolor=#E9E9E9
| 405556 ||  || — || May 14, 2005 || Mount Lemmon || Mount Lemmon Survey || — || align=right | 2.0 km || 
|-id=557 bgcolor=#E9E9E9
| 405557 ||  || — || July 2, 2005 || Kitt Peak || Spacewatch || — || align=right | 1.7 km || 
|-id=558 bgcolor=#E9E9E9
| 405558 ||  || — || July 6, 2005 || Kitt Peak || Spacewatch || — || align=right | 1.8 km || 
|-id=559 bgcolor=#E9E9E9
| 405559 ||  || — || July 4, 2005 || Catalina || CSS || — || align=right | 1.8 km || 
|-id=560 bgcolor=#E9E9E9
| 405560 ||  || — || July 7, 2005 || Mauna Kea || C. Veillet || — || align=right | 1.3 km || 
|-id=561 bgcolor=#E9E9E9
| 405561 ||  || — || July 10, 2005 || Siding Spring || SSS || — || align=right | 1.8 km || 
|-id=562 bgcolor=#FFC2E0
| 405562 ||  || — || July 30, 2005 || Campo Imperatore || CINEOS || AMO +1km || align=right data-sort-value="0.80" | 800 m || 
|-id=563 bgcolor=#E9E9E9
| 405563 ||  || — || July 26, 2005 || Palomar || NEAT || critical || align=right | 1.1 km || 
|-id=564 bgcolor=#E9E9E9
| 405564 ||  || — || July 31, 2005 || Palomar || NEAT || — || align=right | 2.1 km || 
|-id=565 bgcolor=#E9E9E9
| 405565 ||  || — || August 27, 2005 || Pla D'Arguines || R. Ferrando || — || align=right | 1.6 km || 
|-id=566 bgcolor=#E9E9E9
| 405566 ||  || — || August 25, 2005 || Campo Imperatore || CINEOS || EUN || align=right | 1.3 km || 
|-id=567 bgcolor=#E9E9E9
| 405567 ||  || — || August 26, 2005 || Palomar || NEAT || — || align=right | 1.8 km || 
|-id=568 bgcolor=#E9E9E9
| 405568 ||  || — || August 26, 2005 || Campo Imperatore || CINEOS || — || align=right | 3.4 km || 
|-id=569 bgcolor=#E9E9E9
| 405569 ||  || — || August 27, 2005 || Anderson Mesa || LONEOS || — || align=right | 1.6 km || 
|-id=570 bgcolor=#E9E9E9
| 405570 ||  || — || August 28, 2005 || Kitt Peak || Spacewatch || AEO || align=right data-sort-value="0.97" | 970 m || 
|-id=571 bgcolor=#FA8072
| 405571 Erdőspál ||  ||  || August 31, 2005 || Piszkéstető || K. Sárneczky, Z. Kuli || — || align=right data-sort-value="0.59" | 590 m || 
|-id=572 bgcolor=#E9E9E9
| 405572 ||  || — || August 26, 2005 || Palomar || NEAT || DOR || align=right | 2.7 km || 
|-id=573 bgcolor=#E9E9E9
| 405573 ||  || — || August 28, 2005 || Kitt Peak || Spacewatch || — || align=right | 2.2 km || 
|-id=574 bgcolor=#E9E9E9
| 405574 ||  || — || August 28, 2005 || Kitt Peak || Spacewatch || AGN || align=right data-sort-value="0.82" | 820 m || 
|-id=575 bgcolor=#E9E9E9
| 405575 ||  || — || August 28, 2005 || Kitt Peak || Spacewatch || NEM || align=right | 2.0 km || 
|-id=576 bgcolor=#E9E9E9
| 405576 ||  || — || August 28, 2005 || Kitt Peak || Spacewatch || — || align=right | 1.9 km || 
|-id=577 bgcolor=#E9E9E9
| 405577 ||  || — || August 28, 2005 || Kitt Peak || Spacewatch || — || align=right | 1.9 km || 
|-id=578 bgcolor=#E9E9E9
| 405578 ||  || — || August 28, 2005 || Kitt Peak || Spacewatch || — || align=right | 2.0 km || 
|-id=579 bgcolor=#E9E9E9
| 405579 ||  || — || August 31, 2005 || Kitt Peak || Spacewatch || — || align=right | 1.3 km || 
|-id=580 bgcolor=#E9E9E9
| 405580 ||  || — || August 31, 2005 || Kitt Peak || Spacewatch || — || align=right | 2.2 km || 
|-id=581 bgcolor=#E9E9E9
| 405581 ||  || — || August 29, 2005 || Kitt Peak || Spacewatch || AEO || align=right data-sort-value="0.94" | 940 m || 
|-id=582 bgcolor=#E9E9E9
| 405582 ||  || — || September 1, 2005 || Palomar || NEAT || — || align=right | 1.6 km || 
|-id=583 bgcolor=#E9E9E9
| 405583 ||  || — || September 3, 2005 || Palomar || NEAT || TIN || align=right | 1.3 km || 
|-id=584 bgcolor=#E9E9E9
| 405584 ||  || — || September 1, 2005 || Palomar || NEAT || — || align=right | 2.1 km || 
|-id=585 bgcolor=#E9E9E9
| 405585 ||  || — || August 8, 2005 || Siding Spring || SSS || — || align=right | 2.5 km || 
|-id=586 bgcolor=#E9E9E9
| 405586 ||  || — || September 24, 2005 || Kitt Peak || Spacewatch || MRX || align=right | 1.1 km || 
|-id=587 bgcolor=#FA8072
| 405587 ||  || — || September 26, 2005 || Kitt Peak || Spacewatch || — || align=right | 1.6 km || 
|-id=588 bgcolor=#d6d6d6
| 405588 ||  || — || September 23, 2005 || Kitt Peak || Spacewatch || — || align=right | 2.7 km || 
|-id=589 bgcolor=#E9E9E9
| 405589 ||  || — || September 1, 2005 || Kitt Peak || Spacewatch || — || align=right | 2.6 km || 
|-id=590 bgcolor=#fefefe
| 405590 ||  || — || September 24, 2005 || Kitt Peak || Spacewatch || — || align=right data-sort-value="0.39" | 390 m || 
|-id=591 bgcolor=#d6d6d6
| 405591 ||  || — || September 24, 2005 || Kitt Peak || Spacewatch || — || align=right | 2.7 km || 
|-id=592 bgcolor=#E9E9E9
| 405592 ||  || — || September 24, 2005 || Kitt Peak || Spacewatch || — || align=right | 2.4 km || 
|-id=593 bgcolor=#E9E9E9
| 405593 ||  || — || September 25, 2005 || Kitt Peak || Spacewatch || — || align=right | 2.3 km || 
|-id=594 bgcolor=#E9E9E9
| 405594 ||  || — || September 26, 2005 || Kitt Peak || Spacewatch || — || align=right | 2.1 km || 
|-id=595 bgcolor=#E9E9E9
| 405595 ||  || — || September 14, 2005 || Kitt Peak || Spacewatch || — || align=right | 1.7 km || 
|-id=596 bgcolor=#E9E9E9
| 405596 ||  || — || September 24, 2005 || Kitt Peak || Spacewatch || AGN || align=right | 1.3 km || 
|-id=597 bgcolor=#E9E9E9
| 405597 ||  || — || September 24, 2005 || Kitt Peak || Spacewatch || — || align=right | 2.1 km || 
|-id=598 bgcolor=#E9E9E9
| 405598 ||  || — || September 24, 2005 || Kitt Peak || Spacewatch || — || align=right | 2.6 km || 
|-id=599 bgcolor=#E9E9E9
| 405599 ||  || — || September 11, 2005 || Kitt Peak || Spacewatch || — || align=right | 1.6 km || 
|-id=600 bgcolor=#E9E9E9
| 405600 ||  || — || September 25, 2005 || Kitt Peak || Spacewatch || — || align=right | 2.6 km || 
|}

405601–405700 

|-bgcolor=#E9E9E9
| 405601 ||  || — || September 26, 2005 || Kitt Peak || Spacewatch || — || align=right | 2.0 km || 
|-id=602 bgcolor=#E9E9E9
| 405602 ||  || — || September 26, 2005 || Kitt Peak || Spacewatch || — || align=right | 2.4 km || 
|-id=603 bgcolor=#E9E9E9
| 405603 ||  || — || September 27, 2005 || Kitt Peak || Spacewatch || — || align=right | 1.9 km || 
|-id=604 bgcolor=#E9E9E9
| 405604 ||  || — || August 29, 2005 || Kitt Peak || Spacewatch || — || align=right | 2.2 km || 
|-id=605 bgcolor=#E9E9E9
| 405605 ||  || — || September 29, 2005 || Kitt Peak || Spacewatch || AGN || align=right | 1.2 km || 
|-id=606 bgcolor=#E9E9E9
| 405606 ||  || — || September 25, 2005 || Kitt Peak || Spacewatch || — || align=right | 2.0 km || 
|-id=607 bgcolor=#E9E9E9
| 405607 ||  || — || September 25, 2005 || Kitt Peak || Spacewatch || MRX || align=right data-sort-value="0.84" | 840 m || 
|-id=608 bgcolor=#E9E9E9
| 405608 ||  || — || September 26, 2005 || Kitt Peak || Spacewatch || — || align=right | 3.1 km || 
|-id=609 bgcolor=#E9E9E9
| 405609 ||  || — || September 28, 2005 || Palomar || NEAT || — || align=right | 3.3 km || 
|-id=610 bgcolor=#E9E9E9
| 405610 ||  || — || September 28, 2005 || Palomar || NEAT || — || align=right | 2.7 km || 
|-id=611 bgcolor=#E9E9E9
| 405611 ||  || — || September 29, 2005 || Kitt Peak || Spacewatch || — || align=right | 2.0 km || 
|-id=612 bgcolor=#E9E9E9
| 405612 ||  || — || September 29, 2005 || Kitt Peak || Spacewatch || — || align=right | 2.0 km || 
|-id=613 bgcolor=#E9E9E9
| 405613 ||  || — || September 29, 2005 || Kitt Peak || Spacewatch || — || align=right | 1.7 km || 
|-id=614 bgcolor=#d6d6d6
| 405614 ||  || — || September 29, 2005 || Kitt Peak || Spacewatch || — || align=right | 2.2 km || 
|-id=615 bgcolor=#E9E9E9
| 405615 ||  || — || September 29, 2005 || Kitt Peak || Spacewatch || — || align=right | 2.1 km || 
|-id=616 bgcolor=#E9E9E9
| 405616 ||  || — || September 29, 2005 || Kitt Peak || Spacewatch || AGN || align=right data-sort-value="0.86" | 860 m || 
|-id=617 bgcolor=#d6d6d6
| 405617 ||  || — || September 29, 2005 || Mount Lemmon || Mount Lemmon Survey || KOR || align=right | 1.3 km || 
|-id=618 bgcolor=#E9E9E9
| 405618 ||  || — || September 30, 2005 || Kitt Peak || Spacewatch || — || align=right | 2.0 km || 
|-id=619 bgcolor=#E9E9E9
| 405619 ||  || — || September 30, 2005 || Kitt Peak || Spacewatch ||  || align=right | 1.9 km || 
|-id=620 bgcolor=#E9E9E9
| 405620 ||  || — || September 30, 2005 || Catalina || CSS || — || align=right | 2.5 km || 
|-id=621 bgcolor=#E9E9E9
| 405621 ||  || — || September 30, 2005 || Palomar || NEAT || — || align=right | 2.4 km || 
|-id=622 bgcolor=#E9E9E9
| 405622 ||  || — || September 24, 2005 || Kitt Peak || Spacewatch || — || align=right | 2.3 km || 
|-id=623 bgcolor=#E9E9E9
| 405623 ||  || — || September 13, 2005 || Kitt Peak || Spacewatch || — || align=right | 2.0 km || 
|-id=624 bgcolor=#E9E9E9
| 405624 ||  || — || September 30, 2005 || Mount Lemmon || Mount Lemmon Survey || GEF || align=right data-sort-value="0.96" | 960 m || 
|-id=625 bgcolor=#E9E9E9
| 405625 ||  || — || August 29, 2005 || Anderson Mesa || LONEOS || — || align=right | 2.2 km || 
|-id=626 bgcolor=#E9E9E9
| 405626 ||  || — || September 26, 2005 || Kitt Peak || Spacewatch || — || align=right | 1.8 km || 
|-id=627 bgcolor=#E9E9E9
| 405627 ||  || — || September 29, 2005 || Kitt Peak || Spacewatch || HOF || align=right | 2.4 km || 
|-id=628 bgcolor=#E9E9E9
| 405628 ||  || — || September 29, 2005 || Catalina || CSS || — || align=right | 2.8 km || 
|-id=629 bgcolor=#d6d6d6
| 405629 ||  || — || October 1, 2005 || Catalina || CSS || — || align=right | 3.1 km || 
|-id=630 bgcolor=#d6d6d6
| 405630 ||  || — || October 1, 2005 || Kitt Peak || Spacewatch || KOR || align=right | 1.0 km || 
|-id=631 bgcolor=#E9E9E9
| 405631 ||  || — || October 1, 2005 || Kitt Peak || Spacewatch || — || align=right | 2.2 km || 
|-id=632 bgcolor=#E9E9E9
| 405632 ||  || — || October 2, 2005 || Palomar || NEAT || — || align=right | 2.5 km || 
|-id=633 bgcolor=#E9E9E9
| 405633 ||  || — || October 1, 2005 || Kitt Peak || Spacewatch || — || align=right | 2.6 km || 
|-id=634 bgcolor=#E9E9E9
| 405634 ||  || — || September 14, 2005 || Kitt Peak || Spacewatch || HOF || align=right | 2.5 km || 
|-id=635 bgcolor=#E9E9E9
| 405635 ||  || — || October 1, 2005 || Mount Lemmon || Mount Lemmon Survey || — || align=right | 2.5 km || 
|-id=636 bgcolor=#E9E9E9
| 405636 ||  || — || September 25, 2005 || Kitt Peak || Spacewatch || HOF || align=right | 2.5 km || 
|-id=637 bgcolor=#E9E9E9
| 405637 ||  || — || October 3, 2005 || Catalina || CSS || — || align=right | 2.7 km || 
|-id=638 bgcolor=#E9E9E9
| 405638 ||  || — || October 5, 2005 || Mount Lemmon || Mount Lemmon Survey || — || align=right | 1.6 km || 
|-id=639 bgcolor=#E9E9E9
| 405639 ||  || — || October 5, 2005 || Mount Lemmon || Mount Lemmon Survey || — || align=right | 1.7 km || 
|-id=640 bgcolor=#E9E9E9
| 405640 ||  || — || September 23, 2005 || Kitt Peak || Spacewatch || — || align=right | 1.8 km || 
|-id=641 bgcolor=#E9E9E9
| 405641 ||  || — || September 23, 2005 || Kitt Peak || Spacewatch || AGN || align=right | 1.1 km || 
|-id=642 bgcolor=#E9E9E9
| 405642 ||  || — || September 25, 2005 || Kitt Peak || Spacewatch || — || align=right | 1.9 km || 
|-id=643 bgcolor=#E9E9E9
| 405643 ||  || — || August 31, 2005 || Kitt Peak || Spacewatch || — || align=right | 2.3 km || 
|-id=644 bgcolor=#E9E9E9
| 405644 ||  || — || October 1, 2005 || Catalina || CSS || HOF || align=right | 2.8 km || 
|-id=645 bgcolor=#E9E9E9
| 405645 ||  || — || October 7, 2005 || Kitt Peak || Spacewatch || — || align=right | 1.9 km || 
|-id=646 bgcolor=#E9E9E9
| 405646 ||  || — || October 7, 2005 || Kitt Peak || Spacewatch || AGN || align=right | 1.0 km || 
|-id=647 bgcolor=#E9E9E9
| 405647 ||  || — || September 26, 2005 || Kitt Peak || Spacewatch || — || align=right | 2.3 km || 
|-id=648 bgcolor=#d6d6d6
| 405648 ||  || — || October 7, 2005 || Kitt Peak || Spacewatch || — || align=right | 4.2 km || 
|-id=649 bgcolor=#E9E9E9
| 405649 ||  || — || October 8, 2005 || Kitt Peak || Spacewatch || — || align=right | 2.3 km || 
|-id=650 bgcolor=#E9E9E9
| 405650 ||  || — || October 8, 2005 || Kitt Peak || Spacewatch || — || align=right | 2.1 km || 
|-id=651 bgcolor=#E9E9E9
| 405651 ||  || — || October 9, 2005 || Kitt Peak || Spacewatch || AGN || align=right | 1.1 km || 
|-id=652 bgcolor=#E9E9E9
| 405652 ||  || — || October 9, 2005 || Kitt Peak || Spacewatch || — || align=right | 2.0 km || 
|-id=653 bgcolor=#E9E9E9
| 405653 ||  || — || October 11, 2005 || Anderson Mesa || LONEOS || — || align=right | 3.6 km || 
|-id=654 bgcolor=#E9E9E9
| 405654 ||  || — || October 23, 2005 || Kitt Peak || Spacewatch || — || align=right | 2.4 km || 
|-id=655 bgcolor=#E9E9E9
| 405655 ||  || — || October 23, 2005 || Catalina || CSS || — || align=right | 2.6 km || 
|-id=656 bgcolor=#E9E9E9
| 405656 ||  || — || October 22, 2005 || Palomar || NEAT || — || align=right | 2.8 km || 
|-id=657 bgcolor=#E9E9E9
| 405657 ||  || — || October 23, 2005 || Catalina || CSS || — || align=right | 2.5 km || 
|-id=658 bgcolor=#E9E9E9
| 405658 ||  || — || September 15, 2005 || Socorro || LINEAR || — || align=right | 3.4 km || 
|-id=659 bgcolor=#E9E9E9
| 405659 ||  || — || October 7, 2005 || Catalina || CSS || — || align=right | 2.9 km || 
|-id=660 bgcolor=#E9E9E9
| 405660 ||  || — || October 22, 2005 || Kitt Peak || Spacewatch || — || align=right | 2.2 km || 
|-id=661 bgcolor=#d6d6d6
| 405661 ||  || — || October 22, 2005 || Kitt Peak || Spacewatch || — || align=right | 2.5 km || 
|-id=662 bgcolor=#E9E9E9
| 405662 ||  || — || October 22, 2005 || Kitt Peak || Spacewatch || GEF || align=right | 1.6 km || 
|-id=663 bgcolor=#d6d6d6
| 405663 ||  || — || October 24, 2005 || Kitt Peak || Spacewatch || — || align=right | 2.4 km || 
|-id=664 bgcolor=#fefefe
| 405664 ||  || — || September 30, 2005 || Mount Lemmon || Mount Lemmon Survey || — || align=right data-sort-value="0.62" | 620 m || 
|-id=665 bgcolor=#E9E9E9
| 405665 ||  || — || October 24, 2005 || Kitt Peak || Spacewatch || — || align=right | 2.0 km || 
|-id=666 bgcolor=#E9E9E9
| 405666 ||  || — || October 5, 2005 || Kitt Peak || Spacewatch || AGN || align=right | 1.1 km || 
|-id=667 bgcolor=#d6d6d6
| 405667 ||  || — || October 24, 2005 || Kitt Peak || Spacewatch || KOR || align=right | 1.1 km || 
|-id=668 bgcolor=#d6d6d6
| 405668 ||  || — || October 24, 2005 || Kitt Peak || Spacewatch || — || align=right | 2.7 km || 
|-id=669 bgcolor=#d6d6d6
| 405669 ||  || — || October 25, 2005 || Mount Lemmon || Mount Lemmon Survey || — || align=right | 3.2 km || 
|-id=670 bgcolor=#E9E9E9
| 405670 ||  || — || October 26, 2005 || Kitt Peak || Spacewatch || — || align=right | 2.4 km || 
|-id=671 bgcolor=#E9E9E9
| 405671 ||  || — || September 29, 2005 || Mount Lemmon || Mount Lemmon Survey || — || align=right | 1.8 km || 
|-id=672 bgcolor=#d6d6d6
| 405672 ||  || — || October 27, 2005 || Mount Lemmon || Mount Lemmon Survey || KOR || align=right | 1.2 km || 
|-id=673 bgcolor=#d6d6d6
| 405673 ||  || — || October 27, 2005 || Mount Lemmon || Mount Lemmon Survey || — || align=right | 2.1 km || 
|-id=674 bgcolor=#d6d6d6
| 405674 ||  || — || October 27, 2005 || Kitt Peak || Spacewatch || KOR || align=right | 1.3 km || 
|-id=675 bgcolor=#d6d6d6
| 405675 ||  || — || October 25, 2005 || Kitt Peak || Spacewatch || — || align=right | 2.1 km || 
|-id=676 bgcolor=#d6d6d6
| 405676 ||  || — || October 27, 2005 || Kitt Peak || Spacewatch || — || align=right | 1.6 km || 
|-id=677 bgcolor=#E9E9E9
| 405677 ||  || — || October 25, 2005 || Kitt Peak || Spacewatch || HOF || align=right | 3.0 km || 
|-id=678 bgcolor=#E9E9E9
| 405678 ||  || — || October 1, 2005 || Mount Lemmon || Mount Lemmon Survey || AGN || align=right | 1.2 km || 
|-id=679 bgcolor=#d6d6d6
| 405679 ||  || — || October 25, 2005 || Kitt Peak || Spacewatch || — || align=right | 2.1 km || 
|-id=680 bgcolor=#E9E9E9
| 405680 ||  || — || October 25, 2005 || Kitt Peak || Spacewatch || — || align=right | 2.3 km || 
|-id=681 bgcolor=#E9E9E9
| 405681 ||  || — || September 29, 2005 || Mount Lemmon || Mount Lemmon Survey || HOF || align=right | 2.5 km || 
|-id=682 bgcolor=#E9E9E9
| 405682 ||  || — || October 23, 2005 || Catalina || CSS || — || align=right | 2.7 km || 
|-id=683 bgcolor=#E9E9E9
| 405683 ||  || — || September 25, 2005 || Kitt Peak || Spacewatch || — || align=right | 2.2 km || 
|-id=684 bgcolor=#d6d6d6
| 405684 ||  || — || October 24, 2005 || Kitt Peak || Spacewatch || — || align=right | 2.0 km || 
|-id=685 bgcolor=#E9E9E9
| 405685 ||  || — || October 26, 2005 || Kitt Peak || Spacewatch || — || align=right | 2.0 km || 
|-id=686 bgcolor=#d6d6d6
| 405686 ||  || — || October 27, 2005 || Mount Lemmon || Mount Lemmon Survey || KOR || align=right | 1.1 km || 
|-id=687 bgcolor=#E9E9E9
| 405687 ||  || — || October 27, 2005 || Mount Lemmon || Mount Lemmon Survey || — || align=right | 2.2 km || 
|-id=688 bgcolor=#d6d6d6
| 405688 ||  || — || October 27, 2005 || Kitt Peak || Spacewatch || KOR || align=right | 1.2 km || 
|-id=689 bgcolor=#d6d6d6
| 405689 ||  || — || October 27, 2005 || Kitt Peak || Spacewatch || — || align=right | 2.3 km || 
|-id=690 bgcolor=#E9E9E9
| 405690 ||  || — || October 22, 2005 || Kitt Peak || Spacewatch || — || align=right | 2.4 km || 
|-id=691 bgcolor=#d6d6d6
| 405691 ||  || — || October 29, 2005 || Kitt Peak || Spacewatch || — || align=right | 2.4 km || 
|-id=692 bgcolor=#d6d6d6
| 405692 ||  || — || October 1, 2005 || Mount Lemmon || Mount Lemmon Survey || — || align=right | 2.1 km || 
|-id=693 bgcolor=#E9E9E9
| 405693 ||  || — || October 29, 2005 || Mount Lemmon || Mount Lemmon Survey || — || align=right | 1.9 km || 
|-id=694 bgcolor=#d6d6d6
| 405694 ||  || — || October 27, 2005 || Kitt Peak || Spacewatch || NAE || align=right | 2.5 km || 
|-id=695 bgcolor=#d6d6d6
| 405695 ||  || — || October 22, 2005 || Kitt Peak || Spacewatch || — || align=right | 3.1 km || 
|-id=696 bgcolor=#d6d6d6
| 405696 ||  || — || October 26, 2005 || Kitt Peak || Spacewatch || KOR || align=right | 1.3 km || 
|-id=697 bgcolor=#E9E9E9
| 405697 ||  || — || October 30, 2005 || Socorro || LINEAR || — || align=right | 2.2 km || 
|-id=698 bgcolor=#d6d6d6
| 405698 ||  || — || October 7, 2005 || Mount Lemmon || Mount Lemmon Survey || KOR || align=right | 1.1 km || 
|-id=699 bgcolor=#d6d6d6
| 405699 ||  || — || October 10, 2005 || Catalina || CSS || BRA || align=right | 1.6 km || 
|-id=700 bgcolor=#E9E9E9
| 405700 ||  || — || October 27, 2005 || Anderson Mesa || LONEOS || — || align=right | 2.0 km || 
|}

405701–405800 

|-bgcolor=#E9E9E9
| 405701 ||  || — || October 22, 2005 || Apache Point || A. C. Becker || AGN || align=right data-sort-value="0.96" | 960 m || 
|-id=702 bgcolor=#E9E9E9
| 405702 ||  || — || October 26, 2005 || Apache Point || A. C. Becker || AGN || align=right | 1.00 km || 
|-id=703 bgcolor=#d6d6d6
| 405703 ||  || — || September 30, 2005 || Mount Lemmon || Mount Lemmon Survey || KOR || align=right data-sort-value="0.99" | 990 m || 
|-id=704 bgcolor=#d6d6d6
| 405704 ||  || — || October 25, 2005 || Kitt Peak || Spacewatch || — || align=right | 2.5 km || 
|-id=705 bgcolor=#E9E9E9
| 405705 ||  || — || November 1, 2005 || Mount Lemmon || Mount Lemmon Survey || HOF || align=right | 2.5 km || 
|-id=706 bgcolor=#E9E9E9
| 405706 ||  || — || November 1, 2005 || Mount Lemmon || Mount Lemmon Survey || HOF || align=right | 2.9 km || 
|-id=707 bgcolor=#E9E9E9
| 405707 ||  || — || November 1, 2005 || Mount Lemmon || Mount Lemmon Survey || — || align=right | 1.8 km || 
|-id=708 bgcolor=#d6d6d6
| 405708 ||  || — || October 28, 2005 || Mount Lemmon || Mount Lemmon Survey || — || align=right | 3.5 km || 
|-id=709 bgcolor=#d6d6d6
| 405709 ||  || — || October 28, 2005 || Mount Lemmon || Mount Lemmon Survey || KOR || align=right | 1.1 km || 
|-id=710 bgcolor=#E9E9E9
| 405710 ||  || — || November 1, 2005 || Apache Point || A. C. Becker || — || align=right | 2.1 km || 
|-id=711 bgcolor=#d6d6d6
| 405711 ||  || — || November 12, 2005 || Kitt Peak || Spacewatch || — || align=right | 1.7 km || 
|-id=712 bgcolor=#d6d6d6
| 405712 ||  || — || November 21, 2005 || Kitt Peak || Spacewatch || KOR || align=right | 1.3 km || 
|-id=713 bgcolor=#d6d6d6
| 405713 ||  || — || November 22, 2005 || Kitt Peak || Spacewatch || — || align=right | 2.9 km || 
|-id=714 bgcolor=#d6d6d6
| 405714 ||  || — || November 22, 2005 || Kitt Peak || Spacewatch || — || align=right | 2.1 km || 
|-id=715 bgcolor=#d6d6d6
| 405715 ||  || — || November 25, 2005 || Mount Lemmon || Mount Lemmon Survey || — || align=right | 2.4 km || 
|-id=716 bgcolor=#d6d6d6
| 405716 ||  || — || November 21, 2005 || Kitt Peak || Spacewatch || KOR || align=right | 1.3 km || 
|-id=717 bgcolor=#d6d6d6
| 405717 ||  || — || November 5, 2005 || Kitt Peak || Spacewatch || — || align=right | 2.0 km || 
|-id=718 bgcolor=#d6d6d6
| 405718 ||  || — || November 25, 2005 || Kitt Peak || Spacewatch || KOR || align=right | 1.3 km || 
|-id=719 bgcolor=#d6d6d6
| 405719 ||  || — || October 31, 2005 || Catalina || CSS || — || align=right | 3.1 km || 
|-id=720 bgcolor=#d6d6d6
| 405720 ||  || — || November 28, 2005 || Catalina || CSS || — || align=right | 2.8 km || 
|-id=721 bgcolor=#E9E9E9
| 405721 ||  || — || November 22, 2005 || Kitt Peak || Spacewatch || — || align=right | 2.3 km || 
|-id=722 bgcolor=#d6d6d6
| 405722 ||  || — || October 30, 2005 || Mount Lemmon || Mount Lemmon Survey || — || align=right | 3.3 km || 
|-id=723 bgcolor=#d6d6d6
| 405723 ||  || — || November 29, 2005 || Kitt Peak || Spacewatch || — || align=right | 2.4 km || 
|-id=724 bgcolor=#d6d6d6
| 405724 ||  || — || November 4, 2005 || Kitt Peak || Spacewatch || KOR || align=right | 1.4 km || 
|-id=725 bgcolor=#d6d6d6
| 405725 ||  || — || November 29, 2005 || Kitt Peak || Spacewatch || BRA || align=right | 2.1 km || 
|-id=726 bgcolor=#d6d6d6
| 405726 || 2005 XJ || — || December 1, 2005 || Junk Bond || D. Healy || KOR || align=right | 1.6 km || 
|-id=727 bgcolor=#E9E9E9
| 405727 ||  || — || December 2, 2005 || Socorro || LINEAR || DOR || align=right | 3.0 km || 
|-id=728 bgcolor=#fefefe
| 405728 ||  || — || December 4, 2005 || Mount Lemmon || Mount Lemmon Survey || — || align=right data-sort-value="0.57" | 570 m || 
|-id=729 bgcolor=#fefefe
| 405729 ||  || — || December 5, 2005 || Mount Lemmon || Mount Lemmon Survey || — || align=right data-sort-value="0.58" | 580 m || 
|-id=730 bgcolor=#d6d6d6
| 405730 ||  || — || December 6, 2005 || Kitt Peak || Spacewatch || — || align=right | 3.8 km || 
|-id=731 bgcolor=#fefefe
| 405731 ||  || — || December 22, 2005 || Kitt Peak || Spacewatch || — || align=right data-sort-value="0.58" | 580 m || 
|-id=732 bgcolor=#d6d6d6
| 405732 ||  || — || December 21, 2005 || Kitt Peak || Spacewatch || KOR || align=right | 1.9 km || 
|-id=733 bgcolor=#d6d6d6
| 405733 ||  || — || October 27, 2005 || Mount Lemmon || Mount Lemmon Survey || EOS || align=right | 2.1 km || 
|-id=734 bgcolor=#fefefe
| 405734 ||  || — || November 6, 2005 || Mount Lemmon || Mount Lemmon Survey || — || align=right data-sort-value="0.83" | 830 m || 
|-id=735 bgcolor=#d6d6d6
| 405735 ||  || — || December 24, 2005 || Kitt Peak || Spacewatch || — || align=right | 3.5 km || 
|-id=736 bgcolor=#d6d6d6
| 405736 ||  || — || December 24, 2005 || Kitt Peak || Spacewatch || — || align=right | 2.5 km || 
|-id=737 bgcolor=#d6d6d6
| 405737 ||  || — || December 24, 2005 || Kitt Peak || Spacewatch || URS || align=right | 3.8 km || 
|-id=738 bgcolor=#d6d6d6
| 405738 ||  || — || December 22, 2005 || Kitt Peak || Spacewatch || — || align=right | 3.0 km || 
|-id=739 bgcolor=#d6d6d6
| 405739 ||  || — || November 30, 2005 || Mount Lemmon || Mount Lemmon Survey || — || align=right | 3.1 km || 
|-id=740 bgcolor=#d6d6d6
| 405740 ||  || — || December 22, 2005 || Kitt Peak || Spacewatch || — || align=right | 3.4 km || 
|-id=741 bgcolor=#d6d6d6
| 405741 ||  || — || December 25, 2005 || Mount Lemmon || Mount Lemmon Survey || EOS || align=right | 2.3 km || 
|-id=742 bgcolor=#d6d6d6
| 405742 ||  || — || December 24, 2005 || Kitt Peak || Spacewatch || EOS || align=right | 2.0 km || 
|-id=743 bgcolor=#d6d6d6
| 405743 ||  || — || December 5, 2005 || Mount Lemmon || Mount Lemmon Survey || EOS || align=right | 2.3 km || 
|-id=744 bgcolor=#d6d6d6
| 405744 ||  || — || October 1, 2005 || Mount Lemmon || Mount Lemmon Survey || EOS || align=right | 2.1 km || 
|-id=745 bgcolor=#fefefe
| 405745 ||  || — || December 24, 2005 || Kitt Peak || Spacewatch || — || align=right data-sort-value="0.68" | 680 m || 
|-id=746 bgcolor=#d6d6d6
| 405746 ||  || — || December 4, 2005 || Mount Lemmon || Mount Lemmon Survey || — || align=right | 2.6 km || 
|-id=747 bgcolor=#fefefe
| 405747 ||  || — || December 25, 2005 || Kitt Peak || Spacewatch || — || align=right data-sort-value="0.71" | 710 m || 
|-id=748 bgcolor=#d6d6d6
| 405748 ||  || — || December 25, 2005 || Kitt Peak || Spacewatch || EOS || align=right | 2.4 km || 
|-id=749 bgcolor=#d6d6d6
| 405749 ||  || — || December 4, 2005 || Mount Lemmon || Mount Lemmon Survey || EOS || align=right | 1.9 km || 
|-id=750 bgcolor=#d6d6d6
| 405750 ||  || — || December 25, 2005 || Kitt Peak || Spacewatch || KOR || align=right | 1.3 km || 
|-id=751 bgcolor=#d6d6d6
| 405751 ||  || — || December 25, 2005 || Kitt Peak || Spacewatch || — || align=right | 2.3 km || 
|-id=752 bgcolor=#E9E9E9
| 405752 ||  || — || December 24, 2005 || Socorro || LINEAR || — || align=right | 2.8 km || 
|-id=753 bgcolor=#d6d6d6
| 405753 ||  || — || October 30, 2005 || Mount Lemmon || Mount Lemmon Survey || — || align=right | 3.2 km || 
|-id=754 bgcolor=#d6d6d6
| 405754 ||  || — || December 24, 2005 || Kitt Peak || Spacewatch || — || align=right | 3.3 km || 
|-id=755 bgcolor=#d6d6d6
| 405755 ||  || — || December 26, 2005 || Kitt Peak || Spacewatch || — || align=right | 3.3 km || 
|-id=756 bgcolor=#fefefe
| 405756 ||  || — || December 26, 2005 || Kitt Peak || Spacewatch || — || align=right data-sort-value="0.74" | 740 m || 
|-id=757 bgcolor=#fefefe
| 405757 ||  || — || December 26, 2005 || Kitt Peak || Spacewatch || — || align=right data-sort-value="0.62" | 620 m || 
|-id=758 bgcolor=#d6d6d6
| 405758 ||  || — || December 25, 2005 || Kitt Peak || Spacewatch || — || align=right | 2.7 km || 
|-id=759 bgcolor=#fefefe
| 405759 ||  || — || December 25, 2005 || Kitt Peak || Spacewatch || — || align=right data-sort-value="0.86" | 860 m || 
|-id=760 bgcolor=#fefefe
| 405760 ||  || — || December 25, 2005 || Kitt Peak || Spacewatch || — || align=right | 1.00 km || 
|-id=761 bgcolor=#fefefe
| 405761 ||  || — || December 27, 2005 || Mount Lemmon || Mount Lemmon Survey || — || align=right data-sort-value="0.81" | 810 m || 
|-id=762 bgcolor=#FFC2E0
| 405762 ||  || — || December 29, 2005 || Mauna Kea || D. J. Tholen || APOPHA || align=right data-sort-value="0.31" | 310 m || 
|-id=763 bgcolor=#fefefe
| 405763 ||  || — || December 27, 2005 || Kitt Peak || Spacewatch || — || align=right data-sort-value="0.86" | 860 m || 
|-id=764 bgcolor=#d6d6d6
| 405764 ||  || — || December 27, 2005 || Kitt Peak || Spacewatch || EOS || align=right | 2.0 km || 
|-id=765 bgcolor=#fefefe
| 405765 ||  || — || December 30, 2005 || Kitt Peak || Spacewatch || — || align=right data-sort-value="0.53" | 530 m || 
|-id=766 bgcolor=#fefefe
| 405766 ||  || — || December 30, 2005 || Kitt Peak || Spacewatch || — || align=right data-sort-value="0.92" | 920 m || 
|-id=767 bgcolor=#fefefe
| 405767 ||  || — || December 25, 2005 || Kitt Peak || Spacewatch || — || align=right data-sort-value="0.45" | 450 m || 
|-id=768 bgcolor=#d6d6d6
| 405768 ||  || — || December 30, 2005 || Mount Lemmon || Mount Lemmon Survey || — || align=right | 3.2 km || 
|-id=769 bgcolor=#d6d6d6
| 405769 ||  || — || December 24, 2005 || Kitt Peak || Spacewatch || — || align=right | 2.1 km || 
|-id=770 bgcolor=#d6d6d6
| 405770 ||  || — || December 5, 2005 || Kitt Peak || Spacewatch || — || align=right | 3.5 km || 
|-id=771 bgcolor=#d6d6d6
| 405771 ||  || — || December 25, 2005 || Mount Lemmon || Mount Lemmon Survey || — || align=right | 3.1 km || 
|-id=772 bgcolor=#d6d6d6
| 405772 ||  || — || December 29, 2005 || Kitt Peak || Spacewatch || EOS || align=right | 2.1 km || 
|-id=773 bgcolor=#d6d6d6
| 405773 ||  || — || December 29, 2005 || Kitt Peak || Spacewatch || EOS || align=right | 2.3 km || 
|-id=774 bgcolor=#d6d6d6
| 405774 ||  || — || December 27, 2005 || Mount Lemmon || Mount Lemmon Survey || — || align=right | 4.8 km || 
|-id=775 bgcolor=#d6d6d6
| 405775 ||  || — || December 25, 2005 || Kitt Peak || Spacewatch || EOS || align=right | 2.2 km || 
|-id=776 bgcolor=#FA8072
| 405776 ||  || — || January 1, 2006 || Catalina || CSS || — || align=right | 1.3 km || 
|-id=777 bgcolor=#fefefe
| 405777 ||  || — || January 2, 2006 || Socorro || LINEAR || H || align=right | 1.1 km || 
|-id=778 bgcolor=#d6d6d6
| 405778 ||  || — || December 21, 2005 || Kitt Peak || Spacewatch || — || align=right | 3.3 km || 
|-id=779 bgcolor=#d6d6d6
| 405779 ||  || — || January 5, 2006 || Catalina || CSS || — || align=right | 3.0 km || 
|-id=780 bgcolor=#d6d6d6
| 405780 ||  || — || January 4, 2006 || Kitt Peak || Spacewatch || — || align=right | 2.6 km || 
|-id=781 bgcolor=#d6d6d6
| 405781 ||  || — || December 28, 2005 || Kitt Peak || Spacewatch || — || align=right | 2.7 km || 
|-id=782 bgcolor=#d6d6d6
| 405782 ||  || — || October 27, 2005 || Mount Lemmon || Mount Lemmon Survey || — || align=right | 3.0 km || 
|-id=783 bgcolor=#d6d6d6
| 405783 ||  || — || January 6, 2006 || Kitt Peak || Spacewatch || EOS || align=right | 2.0 km || 
|-id=784 bgcolor=#d6d6d6
| 405784 ||  || — || January 7, 2006 || Anderson Mesa || LONEOS || — || align=right | 2.7 km || 
|-id=785 bgcolor=#fefefe
| 405785 ||  || — || January 8, 2006 || Mount Lemmon || Mount Lemmon Survey || — || align=right data-sort-value="0.71" | 710 m || 
|-id=786 bgcolor=#d6d6d6
| 405786 ||  || — || January 5, 2006 || Kitt Peak || Spacewatch || — || align=right | 2.3 km || 
|-id=787 bgcolor=#d6d6d6
| 405787 ||  || — || January 4, 2006 || Kitt Peak || Spacewatch || — || align=right | 3.0 km || 
|-id=788 bgcolor=#fefefe
| 405788 ||  || — || December 25, 2005 || Kitt Peak || Spacewatch || — || align=right data-sort-value="0.98" | 980 m || 
|-id=789 bgcolor=#fefefe
| 405789 ||  || — || January 9, 2006 || Kitt Peak || Spacewatch || — || align=right data-sort-value="0.72" | 720 m || 
|-id=790 bgcolor=#d6d6d6
| 405790 ||  || — || January 5, 2006 || Mount Lemmon || Mount Lemmon Survey || — || align=right | 2.7 km || 
|-id=791 bgcolor=#d6d6d6
| 405791 ||  || — || January 6, 2006 || Mount Lemmon || Mount Lemmon Survey || — || align=right | 2.9 km || 
|-id=792 bgcolor=#d6d6d6
| 405792 ||  || — || January 7, 2006 || Mount Lemmon || Mount Lemmon Survey || VER || align=right | 2.7 km || 
|-id=793 bgcolor=#FA8072
| 405793 ||  || — || January 7, 2006 || Mount Lemmon || Mount Lemmon Survey || — || align=right data-sort-value="0.55" | 550 m || 
|-id=794 bgcolor=#d6d6d6
| 405794 ||  || — || January 6, 2006 || Socorro || LINEAR || — || align=right | 2.8 km || 
|-id=795 bgcolor=#E9E9E9
| 405795 ||  || — || January 7, 2006 || Anderson Mesa || LONEOS || — || align=right | 2.1 km || 
|-id=796 bgcolor=#fefefe
| 405796 ||  || — || January 9, 2006 || Kitt Peak || Spacewatch || — || align=right data-sort-value="0.61" | 610 m || 
|-id=797 bgcolor=#fefefe
| 405797 ||  || — || January 7, 2006 || Mount Lemmon || Mount Lemmon Survey || — || align=right data-sort-value="0.80" | 800 m || 
|-id=798 bgcolor=#d6d6d6
| 405798 ||  || — || January 10, 2006 || Mount Lemmon || Mount Lemmon Survey || (159) || align=right | 3.1 km || 
|-id=799 bgcolor=#d6d6d6
| 405799 ||  || — || January 20, 2006 || Kitt Peak || Spacewatch || — || align=right | 2.5 km || 
|-id=800 bgcolor=#d6d6d6
| 405800 ||  || — || January 7, 2006 || Mount Lemmon || Mount Lemmon Survey || — || align=right | 2.9 km || 
|}

405801–405900 

|-bgcolor=#d6d6d6
| 405801 ||  || — || November 6, 2005 || Mount Lemmon || Mount Lemmon Survey || — || align=right | 3.1 km || 
|-id=802 bgcolor=#d6d6d6
| 405802 ||  || — || January 20, 2006 || Kitt Peak || Spacewatch || — || align=right | 3.6 km || 
|-id=803 bgcolor=#d6d6d6
| 405803 ||  || — || January 23, 2006 || Mount Lemmon || Mount Lemmon Survey || Tj (2.93) || align=right | 4.7 km || 
|-id=804 bgcolor=#d6d6d6
| 405804 ||  || — || January 25, 2006 || Kitt Peak || Spacewatch || — || align=right | 3.0 km || 
|-id=805 bgcolor=#d6d6d6
| 405805 ||  || — || January 25, 2006 || Catalina || CSS || — || align=right | 2.7 km || 
|-id=806 bgcolor=#fefefe
| 405806 ||  || — || January 25, 2006 || Kitt Peak || Spacewatch || — || align=right data-sort-value="0.69" | 690 m || 
|-id=807 bgcolor=#fefefe
| 405807 ||  || — || January 25, 2006 || Kitt Peak || Spacewatch || — || align=right data-sort-value="0.70" | 700 m || 
|-id=808 bgcolor=#d6d6d6
| 405808 ||  || — || January 23, 2006 || Kitt Peak || Spacewatch || — || align=right | 3.2 km || 
|-id=809 bgcolor=#d6d6d6
| 405809 ||  || — || January 25, 2006 || Kitt Peak || Spacewatch || — || align=right | 4.4 km || 
|-id=810 bgcolor=#fefefe
| 405810 ||  || — || January 23, 2006 || Kitt Peak || Spacewatch || — || align=right data-sort-value="0.59" | 590 m || 
|-id=811 bgcolor=#d6d6d6
| 405811 ||  || — || January 23, 2006 || Kitt Peak || Spacewatch || — || align=right | 3.0 km || 
|-id=812 bgcolor=#d6d6d6
| 405812 ||  || — || January 23, 2006 || Kitt Peak || Spacewatch || VER || align=right | 2.4 km || 
|-id=813 bgcolor=#d6d6d6
| 405813 ||  || — || January 23, 2006 || Mount Lemmon || Mount Lemmon Survey || — || align=right | 2.4 km || 
|-id=814 bgcolor=#d6d6d6
| 405814 ||  || — || January 8, 2006 || Kitt Peak || Spacewatch || — || align=right | 2.7 km || 
|-id=815 bgcolor=#d6d6d6
| 405815 ||  || — || December 24, 2005 || Kitt Peak || Spacewatch || — || align=right | 3.9 km || 
|-id=816 bgcolor=#d6d6d6
| 405816 ||  || — || January 26, 2006 || Kitt Peak || Spacewatch || — || align=right | 3.4 km || 
|-id=817 bgcolor=#d6d6d6
| 405817 ||  || — || January 28, 2006 || Catalina || CSS || EUP || align=right | 3.6 km || 
|-id=818 bgcolor=#d6d6d6
| 405818 ||  || — || January 23, 2006 || Mount Lemmon || Mount Lemmon Survey || — || align=right | 2.9 km || 
|-id=819 bgcolor=#d6d6d6
| 405819 ||  || — || January 23, 2006 || Mount Lemmon || Mount Lemmon Survey || VER || align=right | 2.4 km || 
|-id=820 bgcolor=#fefefe
| 405820 ||  || — || January 25, 2006 || Kitt Peak || Spacewatch || — || align=right data-sort-value="0.65" | 650 m || 
|-id=821 bgcolor=#d6d6d6
| 405821 ||  || — || January 25, 2006 || Kitt Peak || Spacewatch || — || align=right | 2.8 km || 
|-id=822 bgcolor=#fefefe
| 405822 ||  || — || January 26, 2006 || Kitt Peak || Spacewatch || — || align=right data-sort-value="0.93" | 930 m || 
|-id=823 bgcolor=#fefefe
| 405823 ||  || — || January 26, 2006 || Kitt Peak || Spacewatch || NYS || align=right data-sort-value="0.58" | 580 m || 
|-id=824 bgcolor=#d6d6d6
| 405824 ||  || — || December 5, 2005 || Mount Lemmon || Mount Lemmon Survey || — || align=right | 2.1 km || 
|-id=825 bgcolor=#d6d6d6
| 405825 ||  || — || January 25, 2006 || Kitt Peak || Spacewatch || THM || align=right | 2.2 km || 
|-id=826 bgcolor=#fefefe
| 405826 ||  || — || January 28, 2006 || Mount Lemmon || Mount Lemmon Survey || — || align=right data-sort-value="0.68" | 680 m || 
|-id=827 bgcolor=#d6d6d6
| 405827 ||  || — || January 28, 2006 || Mount Lemmon || Mount Lemmon Survey || — || align=right | 3.3 km || 
|-id=828 bgcolor=#d6d6d6
| 405828 ||  || — || January 26, 2006 || Kitt Peak || Spacewatch || — || align=right | 2.6 km || 
|-id=829 bgcolor=#fefefe
| 405829 ||  || — || January 27, 2006 || Mount Lemmon || Mount Lemmon Survey || — || align=right data-sort-value="0.81" | 810 m || 
|-id=830 bgcolor=#d6d6d6
| 405830 ||  || — || January 9, 2006 || Kitt Peak || Spacewatch || — || align=right | 3.4 km || 
|-id=831 bgcolor=#d6d6d6
| 405831 ||  || — || January 25, 2006 || Kitt Peak || Spacewatch || EOS || align=right | 2.0 km || 
|-id=832 bgcolor=#fefefe
| 405832 ||  || — || January 25, 2006 || Kitt Peak || Spacewatch || — || align=right data-sort-value="0.85" | 850 m || 
|-id=833 bgcolor=#fefefe
| 405833 ||  || — || December 25, 2005 || Mount Lemmon || Mount Lemmon Survey || — || align=right data-sort-value="0.84" | 840 m || 
|-id=834 bgcolor=#fefefe
| 405834 ||  || — || January 26, 2006 || Kitt Peak || Spacewatch || — || align=right data-sort-value="0.73" | 730 m || 
|-id=835 bgcolor=#d6d6d6
| 405835 ||  || — || January 7, 2006 || Mount Lemmon || Mount Lemmon Survey || — || align=right | 4.2 km || 
|-id=836 bgcolor=#fefefe
| 405836 ||  || — || January 27, 2006 || Mount Lemmon || Mount Lemmon Survey || — || align=right data-sort-value="0.68" | 680 m || 
|-id=837 bgcolor=#d6d6d6
| 405837 ||  || — || January 27, 2006 || Mount Lemmon || Mount Lemmon Survey || EOS || align=right | 2.2 km || 
|-id=838 bgcolor=#d6d6d6
| 405838 ||  || — || January 5, 2006 || Mount Lemmon || Mount Lemmon Survey || — || align=right | 3.2 km || 
|-id=839 bgcolor=#fefefe
| 405839 ||  || — || January 30, 2006 || Kitt Peak || Spacewatch || — || align=right data-sort-value="0.64" | 640 m || 
|-id=840 bgcolor=#d6d6d6
| 405840 ||  || — || April 13, 2001 || Kitt Peak || Spacewatch || THM || align=right | 2.6 km || 
|-id=841 bgcolor=#d6d6d6
| 405841 ||  || — || January 31, 2006 || Kitt Peak || Spacewatch || TIR || align=right | 2.9 km || 
|-id=842 bgcolor=#fefefe
| 405842 ||  || — || January 30, 2006 || Kitt Peak || Spacewatch || — || align=right data-sort-value="0.73" | 730 m || 
|-id=843 bgcolor=#fefefe
| 405843 ||  || — || January 26, 2006 || Kitt Peak || Spacewatch || — || align=right data-sort-value="0.79" | 790 m || 
|-id=844 bgcolor=#d6d6d6
| 405844 ||  || — || December 5, 2005 || Mount Lemmon || Mount Lemmon Survey || — || align=right | 2.4 km || 
|-id=845 bgcolor=#d6d6d6
| 405845 ||  || — || January 23, 2006 || Kitt Peak || Spacewatch || — || align=right | 3.5 km || 
|-id=846 bgcolor=#d6d6d6
| 405846 ||  || — || January 31, 2006 || Kitt Peak || Spacewatch || — || align=right | 3.2 km || 
|-id=847 bgcolor=#d6d6d6
| 405847 ||  || — || January 31, 2006 || Catalina || CSS || — || align=right | 3.9 km || 
|-id=848 bgcolor=#fefefe
| 405848 ||  || — || January 26, 2006 || Kitt Peak || Spacewatch || — || align=right data-sort-value="0.64" | 640 m || 
|-id=849 bgcolor=#d6d6d6
| 405849 ||  || — || January 23, 2006 || Kitt Peak || Spacewatch || — || align=right | 3.8 km || 
|-id=850 bgcolor=#d6d6d6
| 405850 ||  || — || January 22, 2006 || Mount Lemmon || Mount Lemmon Survey || — || align=right | 2.1 km || 
|-id=851 bgcolor=#d6d6d6
| 405851 ||  || — || January 7, 2006 || Mount Lemmon || Mount Lemmon Survey || EMA || align=right | 3.5 km || 
|-id=852 bgcolor=#d6d6d6
| 405852 ||  || — || February 1, 2006 || Kitt Peak || Spacewatch || — || align=right | 2.5 km || 
|-id=853 bgcolor=#d6d6d6
| 405853 ||  || — || January 8, 2006 || Mount Lemmon || Mount Lemmon Survey || — || align=right | 3.3 km || 
|-id=854 bgcolor=#d6d6d6
| 405854 ||  || — || January 22, 2006 || Mount Lemmon || Mount Lemmon Survey || — || align=right | 3.0 km || 
|-id=855 bgcolor=#d6d6d6
| 405855 ||  || — || August 4, 2003 || Kitt Peak || Spacewatch || — || align=right | 3.0 km || 
|-id=856 bgcolor=#fefefe
| 405856 ||  || — || January 23, 2006 || Kitt Peak || Spacewatch || — || align=right data-sort-value="0.79" | 790 m || 
|-id=857 bgcolor=#d6d6d6
| 405857 ||  || — || February 24, 2006 || Kitt Peak || Spacewatch || — || align=right | 3.9 km || 
|-id=858 bgcolor=#d6d6d6
| 405858 ||  || — || February 24, 2006 || Mount Lemmon || Mount Lemmon Survey || — || align=right | 2.8 km || 
|-id=859 bgcolor=#d6d6d6
| 405859 ||  || — || February 24, 2006 || Mount Lemmon || Mount Lemmon Survey || EUP || align=right | 4.4 km || 
|-id=860 bgcolor=#fefefe
| 405860 ||  || — || February 21, 2006 || Catalina || CSS || — || align=right data-sort-value="0.88" | 880 m || 
|-id=861 bgcolor=#fefefe
| 405861 ||  || — || February 24, 2006 || Kitt Peak || Spacewatch || NYS || align=right data-sort-value="0.58" | 580 m || 
|-id=862 bgcolor=#fefefe
| 405862 ||  || — || February 24, 2006 || Kitt Peak || Spacewatch || — || align=right data-sort-value="0.57" | 570 m || 
|-id=863 bgcolor=#d6d6d6
| 405863 ||  || — || February 24, 2006 || Kitt Peak || Spacewatch || — || align=right | 2.5 km || 
|-id=864 bgcolor=#d6d6d6
| 405864 ||  || — || February 24, 2006 || Kitt Peak || Spacewatch || — || align=right | 3.3 km || 
|-id=865 bgcolor=#d6d6d6
| 405865 ||  || — || February 24, 2006 || Mount Lemmon || Mount Lemmon Survey || — || align=right | 4.5 km || 
|-id=866 bgcolor=#d6d6d6
| 405866 ||  || — || January 26, 2006 || Kitt Peak || Spacewatch || — || align=right | 2.3 km || 
|-id=867 bgcolor=#d6d6d6
| 405867 ||  || — || February 27, 2006 || Kitt Peak || Spacewatch || — || align=right | 3.7 km || 
|-id=868 bgcolor=#d6d6d6
| 405868 ||  || — || February 20, 2006 || Kitt Peak || Spacewatch || — || align=right | 3.1 km || 
|-id=869 bgcolor=#fefefe
| 405869 ||  || — || January 23, 2006 || Mount Lemmon || Mount Lemmon Survey || — || align=right data-sort-value="0.68" | 680 m || 
|-id=870 bgcolor=#fefefe
| 405870 ||  || — || February 25, 2006 || Kitt Peak || Spacewatch || — || align=right data-sort-value="0.89" | 890 m || 
|-id=871 bgcolor=#fefefe
| 405871 ||  || — || February 25, 2006 || Kitt Peak || Spacewatch || — || align=right data-sort-value="0.72" | 720 m || 
|-id=872 bgcolor=#d6d6d6
| 405872 ||  || — || February 27, 2006 || Mount Lemmon || Mount Lemmon Survey || HYG || align=right | 2.8 km || 
|-id=873 bgcolor=#d6d6d6
| 405873 ||  || — || September 27, 2003 || Kitt Peak || Spacewatch || — || align=right | 2.9 km || 
|-id=874 bgcolor=#fefefe
| 405874 ||  || — || February 24, 2006 || Palomar || NEAT || PHO || align=right | 1.8 km || 
|-id=875 bgcolor=#fefefe
| 405875 ||  || — || February 20, 2006 || Kitt Peak || Spacewatch || NYS || align=right data-sort-value="0.59" | 590 m || 
|-id=876 bgcolor=#d6d6d6
| 405876 ||  || — || February 20, 2006 || Kitt Peak || Spacewatch || — || align=right | 2.6 km || 
|-id=877 bgcolor=#fefefe
| 405877 ||  || — || October 3, 1997 || Kitt Peak || Spacewatch || — || align=right data-sort-value="0.73" | 730 m || 
|-id=878 bgcolor=#fefefe
| 405878 ||  || — || February 4, 2006 || Mount Lemmon || Mount Lemmon Survey || NYS || align=right data-sort-value="0.70" | 700 m || 
|-id=879 bgcolor=#fefefe
| 405879 ||  || — || March 2, 2006 || Kitt Peak || Spacewatch || — || align=right | 1.0 km || 
|-id=880 bgcolor=#fefefe
| 405880 ||  || — || March 2, 2006 || Kitt Peak || Spacewatch || — || align=right data-sort-value="0.63" | 630 m || 
|-id=881 bgcolor=#fefefe
| 405881 ||  || — || February 20, 2006 || Kitt Peak || Spacewatch || — || align=right data-sort-value="0.73" | 730 m || 
|-id=882 bgcolor=#d6d6d6
| 405882 ||  || — || January 30, 2006 || Kitt Peak || Spacewatch || — || align=right | 2.9 km || 
|-id=883 bgcolor=#d6d6d6
| 405883 ||  || — || March 3, 2006 || Kitt Peak || Spacewatch || — || align=right | 2.8 km || 
|-id=884 bgcolor=#fefefe
| 405884 ||  || — || March 3, 2006 || Kitt Peak || Spacewatch || PHO || align=right | 2.2 km || 
|-id=885 bgcolor=#fefefe
| 405885 ||  || — || March 8, 2006 || Kitt Peak || Spacewatch || — || align=right data-sort-value="0.65" | 650 m || 
|-id=886 bgcolor=#d6d6d6
| 405886 ||  || — || January 5, 2006 || Mount Lemmon || Mount Lemmon Survey || — || align=right | 2.8 km || 
|-id=887 bgcolor=#d6d6d6
| 405887 ||  || — || March 23, 2006 || Mount Lemmon || Mount Lemmon Survey || — || align=right | 3.0 km || 
|-id=888 bgcolor=#d6d6d6
| 405888 ||  || — || March 25, 2006 || Kitt Peak || Spacewatch || — || align=right | 3.2 km || 
|-id=889 bgcolor=#d6d6d6
| 405889 ||  || — || March 25, 2006 || Mount Lemmon || Mount Lemmon Survey || — || align=right | 4.1 km || 
|-id=890 bgcolor=#fefefe
| 405890 ||  || — || March 25, 2006 || Kitt Peak || Spacewatch || MAS || align=right data-sort-value="0.78" | 780 m || 
|-id=891 bgcolor=#fefefe
| 405891 ||  || — || January 6, 2006 || Mount Lemmon || Mount Lemmon Survey || — || align=right data-sort-value="0.95" | 950 m || 
|-id=892 bgcolor=#d6d6d6
| 405892 ||  || — || March 24, 2006 || Kitt Peak || Spacewatch || — || align=right | 3.4 km || 
|-id=893 bgcolor=#fefefe
| 405893 ||  || — || April 2, 2006 || Kitt Peak || Spacewatch || — || align=right data-sort-value="0.77" | 770 m || 
|-id=894 bgcolor=#fefefe
| 405894 ||  || — || April 2, 2006 || Kitt Peak || Spacewatch || V || align=right data-sort-value="0.73" | 730 m || 
|-id=895 bgcolor=#FA8072
| 405895 ||  || — || April 6, 2006 || Catalina || CSS || — || align=right | 1.1 km || 
|-id=896 bgcolor=#d6d6d6
| 405896 ||  || — || March 4, 2006 || Kitt Peak || Spacewatch || — || align=right | 3.0 km || 
|-id=897 bgcolor=#fefefe
| 405897 ||  || — || April 20, 2006 || Kitt Peak || Spacewatch || — || align=right data-sort-value="0.98" | 980 m || 
|-id=898 bgcolor=#fefefe
| 405898 ||  || — || March 23, 2006 || Mount Lemmon || Mount Lemmon Survey || — || align=right data-sort-value="0.70" | 700 m || 
|-id=899 bgcolor=#fefefe
| 405899 ||  || — || April 18, 2006 || Kitt Peak || Spacewatch || V || align=right data-sort-value="0.56" | 560 m || 
|-id=900 bgcolor=#fefefe
| 405900 ||  || — || April 20, 2006 || Kitt Peak || Spacewatch || NYS || align=right data-sort-value="0.73" | 730 m || 
|}

405901–406000 

|-bgcolor=#fefefe
| 405901 ||  || — || April 20, 2006 || Kitt Peak || Spacewatch || NYS || align=right data-sort-value="0.57" | 570 m || 
|-id=902 bgcolor=#fefefe
| 405902 ||  || — || March 23, 2006 || Kitt Peak || Spacewatch || — || align=right data-sort-value="0.91" | 910 m || 
|-id=903 bgcolor=#fefefe
| 405903 ||  || — || April 24, 2006 || Kitt Peak || Spacewatch || — || align=right data-sort-value="0.68" | 680 m || 
|-id=904 bgcolor=#fefefe
| 405904 ||  || — || April 25, 2006 || Kitt Peak || Spacewatch || V || align=right data-sort-value="0.61" | 610 m || 
|-id=905 bgcolor=#fefefe
| 405905 ||  || — || April 25, 2006 || Kitt Peak || Spacewatch || — || align=right data-sort-value="0.81" | 810 m || 
|-id=906 bgcolor=#fefefe
| 405906 ||  || — || April 26, 2006 || Kitt Peak || Spacewatch || — || align=right data-sort-value="0.69" | 690 m || 
|-id=907 bgcolor=#fefefe
| 405907 ||  || — || April 26, 2006 || Kitt Peak || Spacewatch || — || align=right data-sort-value="0.73" | 730 m || 
|-id=908 bgcolor=#fefefe
| 405908 ||  || — || April 30, 2006 || Kitt Peak || Spacewatch || — || align=right data-sort-value="0.85" | 850 m || 
|-id=909 bgcolor=#d6d6d6
| 405909 ||  || — || March 9, 2005 || Catalina || CSS || — || align=right | 4.3 km || 
|-id=910 bgcolor=#d6d6d6
| 405910 ||  || — || April 26, 2006 || Mount Lemmon || Mount Lemmon Survey || — || align=right | 4.6 km || 
|-id=911 bgcolor=#fefefe
| 405911 ||  || — || April 30, 2006 || Kitt Peak || Spacewatch || NYS || align=right data-sort-value="0.70" | 700 m || 
|-id=912 bgcolor=#d6d6d6
| 405912 ||  || — || April 26, 2006 || Cerro Tololo || M. W. Buie || — || align=right | 2.7 km || 
|-id=913 bgcolor=#fefefe
| 405913 ||  || — || April 19, 2006 || Kitt Peak || Spacewatch || NYS || align=right data-sort-value="0.63" | 630 m || 
|-id=914 bgcolor=#fefefe
| 405914 ||  || — || May 1, 2006 || Kitt Peak || M. W. Buie || — || align=right data-sort-value="0.75" | 750 m || 
|-id=915 bgcolor=#fefefe
| 405915 ||  || — || May 1, 2006 || Mauna Kea || P. A. Wiegert || — || align=right data-sort-value="0.65" | 650 m || 
|-id=916 bgcolor=#fefefe
| 405916 ||  || — || May 8, 2006 || Mount Lemmon || Mount Lemmon Survey || — || align=right data-sort-value="0.71" | 710 m || 
|-id=917 bgcolor=#fefefe
| 405917 ||  || — || May 9, 2006 || Mount Lemmon || Mount Lemmon Survey || — || align=right data-sort-value="0.90" | 900 m || 
|-id=918 bgcolor=#d6d6d6
| 405918 ||  || — || May 20, 2006 || Kitt Peak || Spacewatch || VER || align=right | 6.4 km || 
|-id=919 bgcolor=#fefefe
| 405919 ||  || — || May 21, 2006 || Mount Lemmon || Mount Lemmon Survey || — || align=right data-sort-value="0.94" | 940 m || 
|-id=920 bgcolor=#fefefe
| 405920 ||  || — || May 21, 2006 || Kitt Peak || Spacewatch || — || align=right data-sort-value="0.83" | 830 m || 
|-id=921 bgcolor=#fefefe
| 405921 ||  || — || May 21, 2006 || Kitt Peak || Spacewatch || MAS || align=right data-sort-value="0.69" | 690 m || 
|-id=922 bgcolor=#fefefe
| 405922 ||  || — || May 21, 2006 || Kitt Peak || Spacewatch || — || align=right data-sort-value="0.90" | 900 m || 
|-id=923 bgcolor=#fefefe
| 405923 ||  || — || May 22, 2006 || Kitt Peak || Spacewatch || — || align=right data-sort-value="0.74" | 740 m || 
|-id=924 bgcolor=#fefefe
| 405924 ||  || — || May 20, 2006 || Palomar || NEAT || — || align=right data-sort-value="0.81" | 810 m || 
|-id=925 bgcolor=#fefefe
| 405925 ||  || — || May 22, 2006 || Kitt Peak || Spacewatch || — || align=right data-sort-value="0.64" | 640 m || 
|-id=926 bgcolor=#fefefe
| 405926 ||  || — || May 31, 2006 || Mount Lemmon || Mount Lemmon Survey || NYS || align=right data-sort-value="0.66" | 660 m || 
|-id=927 bgcolor=#E9E9E9
| 405927 ||  || — || July 25, 2006 || Mount Lemmon || Mount Lemmon Survey || — || align=right data-sort-value="0.68" | 680 m || 
|-id=928 bgcolor=#d6d6d6
| 405928 ||  || — || August 15, 2006 || Palomar || NEAT || 3:2 || align=right | 6.5 km || 
|-id=929 bgcolor=#E9E9E9
| 405929 ||  || — || August 17, 2006 || Palomar || NEAT || — || align=right | 1.5 km || 
|-id=930 bgcolor=#d6d6d6
| 405930 ||  || — || August 21, 2006 || Kitt Peak || Spacewatch || SHU3:2 || align=right | 6.0 km || 
|-id=931 bgcolor=#d6d6d6
| 405931 ||  || — || August 25, 2006 || Socorro || LINEAR || SHU3:2 || align=right | 6.6 km || 
|-id=932 bgcolor=#E9E9E9
| 405932 ||  || — || August 16, 2006 || Palomar || NEAT || — || align=right | 1.4 km || 
|-id=933 bgcolor=#E9E9E9
| 405933 ||  || — || August 28, 2006 || Kitt Peak || Spacewatch || — || align=right data-sort-value="0.89" | 890 m || 
|-id=934 bgcolor=#fefefe
| 405934 ||  || — || September 12, 2006 || Catalina || CSS || H || align=right data-sort-value="0.76" | 760 m || 
|-id=935 bgcolor=#E9E9E9
| 405935 ||  || — || September 14, 2006 || Catalina || CSS || — || align=right | 1.1 km || 
|-id=936 bgcolor=#E9E9E9
| 405936 ||  || — || September 14, 2006 || Kitt Peak || Spacewatch || — || align=right data-sort-value="0.86" | 860 m || 
|-id=937 bgcolor=#E9E9E9
| 405937 ||  || — || September 2, 2006 || Marly || Naef Obs. || — || align=right | 1.1 km || 
|-id=938 bgcolor=#E9E9E9
| 405938 ||  || — || September 14, 2006 || Kitt Peak || Spacewatch || — || align=right data-sort-value="0.90" | 900 m || 
|-id=939 bgcolor=#E9E9E9
| 405939 ||  || — || September 14, 2006 || Kitt Peak || Spacewatch || (5) || align=right data-sort-value="0.64" | 640 m || 
|-id=940 bgcolor=#E9E9E9
| 405940 ||  || — || September 14, 2006 || Kitt Peak || Spacewatch || — || align=right | 1.5 km || 
|-id=941 bgcolor=#E9E9E9
| 405941 ||  || — || September 14, 2006 || Kitt Peak || Spacewatch || RAF || align=right data-sort-value="0.70" | 700 m || 
|-id=942 bgcolor=#E9E9E9
| 405942 ||  || — || September 14, 2006 || Kitt Peak || Spacewatch || BRG || align=right | 1.2 km || 
|-id=943 bgcolor=#d6d6d6
| 405943 ||  || — || September 15, 2006 || Kitt Peak || Spacewatch || SHU3:2 || align=right | 5.5 km || 
|-id=944 bgcolor=#E9E9E9
| 405944 ||  || — || September 15, 2006 || Kitt Peak || Spacewatch || — || align=right | 1.3 km || 
|-id=945 bgcolor=#E9E9E9
| 405945 ||  || — || September 15, 2006 || Kitt Peak || Spacewatch || — || align=right | 1.4 km || 
|-id=946 bgcolor=#E9E9E9
| 405946 ||  || — || September 15, 2006 || Kitt Peak || Spacewatch || — || align=right data-sort-value="0.65" | 650 m || 
|-id=947 bgcolor=#E9E9E9
| 405947 ||  || — || September 15, 2006 || Kitt Peak || Spacewatch || — || align=right data-sort-value="0.73" | 730 m || 
|-id=948 bgcolor=#E9E9E9
| 405948 ||  || — || September 15, 2006 || Kitt Peak || Spacewatch || — || align=right | 1.0 km || 
|-id=949 bgcolor=#E9E9E9
| 405949 ||  || — || September 14, 2006 || Mauna Kea || J. Masiero || — || align=right data-sort-value="0.79" | 790 m || 
|-id=950 bgcolor=#E9E9E9
| 405950 ||  || — || September 14, 2006 || Kitt Peak || Spacewatch || — || align=right data-sort-value="0.83" | 830 m || 
|-id=951 bgcolor=#E9E9E9
| 405951 ||  || — || September 16, 2006 || Kitt Peak || Spacewatch || — || align=right | 1.1 km || 
|-id=952 bgcolor=#E9E9E9
| 405952 ||  || — || September 16, 2006 || Catalina || CSS || — || align=right data-sort-value="0.94" | 940 m || 
|-id=953 bgcolor=#E9E9E9
| 405953 ||  || — || September 16, 2006 || Palomar || NEAT || — || align=right data-sort-value="0.82" | 820 m || 
|-id=954 bgcolor=#fefefe
| 405954 ||  || — || September 16, 2006 || Palomar || NEAT || H || align=right data-sort-value="0.64" | 640 m || 
|-id=955 bgcolor=#E9E9E9
| 405955 ||  || — || September 16, 2006 || Siding Spring || SSS || MAR || align=right | 1.2 km || 
|-id=956 bgcolor=#E9E9E9
| 405956 ||  || — || September 16, 2006 || Catalina || CSS || — || align=right data-sort-value="0.95" | 950 m || 
|-id=957 bgcolor=#E9E9E9
| 405957 ||  || — || September 17, 2006 || Socorro || LINEAR || — || align=right | 2.2 km || 
|-id=958 bgcolor=#E9E9E9
| 405958 ||  || — || September 17, 2006 || Kitt Peak || Spacewatch || — || align=right | 1.2 km || 
|-id=959 bgcolor=#E9E9E9
| 405959 ||  || — || September 17, 2006 || Catalina || CSS || — || align=right data-sort-value="0.90" | 900 m || 
|-id=960 bgcolor=#E9E9E9
| 405960 ||  || — || September 17, 2006 || Catalina || CSS || — || align=right data-sort-value="0.75" | 750 m || 
|-id=961 bgcolor=#E9E9E9
| 405961 ||  || — || September 18, 2006 || Catalina || CSS || — || align=right data-sort-value="0.90" | 900 m || 
|-id=962 bgcolor=#E9E9E9
| 405962 ||  || — || September 19, 2006 || Catalina || CSS || — || align=right | 2.6 km || 
|-id=963 bgcolor=#E9E9E9
| 405963 ||  || — || September 18, 2006 || Catalina || CSS || (5) || align=right data-sort-value="0.81" | 810 m || 
|-id=964 bgcolor=#E9E9E9
| 405964 ||  || — || September 18, 2006 || Kitt Peak || Spacewatch || — || align=right | 1.3 km || 
|-id=965 bgcolor=#E9E9E9
| 405965 ||  || — || September 19, 2006 || Kitt Peak || Spacewatch || — || align=right | 1.4 km || 
|-id=966 bgcolor=#E9E9E9
| 405966 ||  || — || September 19, 2006 || Kitt Peak || Spacewatch || — || align=right | 1.9 km || 
|-id=967 bgcolor=#E9E9E9
| 405967 ||  || — || September 18, 2006 || Kitt Peak || Spacewatch || — || align=right | 1.3 km || 
|-id=968 bgcolor=#E9E9E9
| 405968 ||  || — || September 18, 2006 || Kitt Peak || Spacewatch || — || align=right data-sort-value="0.86" | 860 m || 
|-id=969 bgcolor=#E9E9E9
| 405969 ||  || — || September 19, 2006 || Kitt Peak || Spacewatch || — || align=right | 1.3 km || 
|-id=970 bgcolor=#E9E9E9
| 405970 ||  || — || September 19, 2006 || Kitt Peak || Spacewatch || MIS || align=right | 2.7 km || 
|-id=971 bgcolor=#E9E9E9
| 405971 ||  || — || September 23, 2006 || Kitt Peak || Spacewatch || ADE || align=right | 2.3 km || 
|-id=972 bgcolor=#E9E9E9
| 405972 ||  || — || September 24, 2006 || Kitt Peak || Spacewatch || — || align=right data-sort-value="0.98" | 980 m || 
|-id=973 bgcolor=#E9E9E9
| 405973 ||  || — || September 19, 2006 || Catalina || CSS || — || align=right | 2.6 km || 
|-id=974 bgcolor=#fefefe
| 405974 ||  || — || September 17, 2006 || Catalina || CSS || H || align=right data-sort-value="0.73" | 730 m || 
|-id=975 bgcolor=#E9E9E9
| 405975 ||  || — || September 16, 2006 || Catalina || CSS || (194) || align=right | 1.1 km || 
|-id=976 bgcolor=#E9E9E9
| 405976 ||  || — || September 19, 2006 || Kitt Peak || Spacewatch || (5) || align=right data-sort-value="0.70" | 700 m || 
|-id=977 bgcolor=#E9E9E9
| 405977 ||  || — || September 20, 2006 || Kitt Peak || Spacewatch || (5) || align=right data-sort-value="0.81" | 810 m || 
|-id=978 bgcolor=#fefefe
| 405978 ||  || — || September 20, 2006 || Catalina || CSS || H || align=right data-sort-value="0.89" | 890 m || 
|-id=979 bgcolor=#E9E9E9
| 405979 ||  || — || September 21, 2006 || Anderson Mesa || LONEOS || (5) || align=right data-sort-value="0.81" | 810 m || 
|-id=980 bgcolor=#fefefe
| 405980 ||  || — || August 29, 2006 || Catalina || CSS || — || align=right | 1.2 km || 
|-id=981 bgcolor=#E9E9E9
| 405981 ||  || — || September 25, 2006 || Mount Lemmon || Mount Lemmon Survey || — || align=right data-sort-value="0.75" | 750 m || 
|-id=982 bgcolor=#E9E9E9
| 405982 ||  || — || September 25, 2006 || Mount Lemmon || Mount Lemmon Survey || — || align=right | 2.5 km || 
|-id=983 bgcolor=#fefefe
| 405983 ||  || — || September 11, 2006 || Catalina || CSS || H || align=right data-sort-value="0.81" | 810 m || 
|-id=984 bgcolor=#E9E9E9
| 405984 ||  || — || September 26, 2006 || Kitt Peak || Spacewatch || — || align=right data-sort-value="0.68" | 680 m || 
|-id=985 bgcolor=#E9E9E9
| 405985 ||  || — || September 25, 2006 || Mount Lemmon || Mount Lemmon Survey || — || align=right | 1.2 km || 
|-id=986 bgcolor=#E9E9E9
| 405986 ||  || — || September 26, 2006 || Kitt Peak || Spacewatch || (5) || align=right data-sort-value="0.77" | 770 m || 
|-id=987 bgcolor=#E9E9E9
| 405987 ||  || — || September 26, 2006 || Kitt Peak || Spacewatch || — || align=right | 1.0 km || 
|-id=988 bgcolor=#E9E9E9
| 405988 ||  || — || September 29, 2006 || Anderson Mesa || LONEOS || EUN || align=right | 1.4 km || 
|-id=989 bgcolor=#E9E9E9
| 405989 ||  || — || September 22, 2006 || Anderson Mesa || LONEOS || — || align=right | 1.4 km || 
|-id=990 bgcolor=#E9E9E9
| 405990 ||  || — || September 17, 2006 || Kitt Peak || Spacewatch || (5) || align=right data-sort-value="0.61" | 610 m || 
|-id=991 bgcolor=#E9E9E9
| 405991 ||  || — || September 27, 2006 || Kitt Peak || Spacewatch || — || align=right | 2.2 km || 
|-id=992 bgcolor=#E9E9E9
| 405992 ||  || — || September 27, 2006 || Kitt Peak || Spacewatch || — || align=right data-sort-value="0.80" | 800 m || 
|-id=993 bgcolor=#E9E9E9
| 405993 ||  || — || September 27, 2006 || Kitt Peak || Spacewatch || — || align=right data-sort-value="0.86" | 860 m || 
|-id=994 bgcolor=#E9E9E9
| 405994 ||  || — || September 28, 2006 || Kitt Peak || Spacewatch || — || align=right | 3.4 km || 
|-id=995 bgcolor=#E9E9E9
| 405995 ||  || — || July 21, 2006 || Mount Lemmon || Mount Lemmon Survey || — || align=right | 1.8 km || 
|-id=996 bgcolor=#E9E9E9
| 405996 ||  || — || September 18, 2006 || Kitt Peak || Spacewatch || HNS || align=right | 1.3 km || 
|-id=997 bgcolor=#E9E9E9
| 405997 ||  || — || September 28, 2006 || Kitt Peak || Spacewatch || — || align=right | 1.2 km || 
|-id=998 bgcolor=#d6d6d6
| 405998 ||  || — || September 30, 2006 || Catalina || CSS || 3:2 || align=right | 4.9 km || 
|-id=999 bgcolor=#E9E9E9
| 405999 ||  || — || September 30, 2006 || Catalina || CSS || EUN || align=right | 1.3 km || 
|-id=000 bgcolor=#E9E9E9
| 406000 ||  || — || September 30, 2006 || Catalina || CSS || EUN || align=right | 1.4 km || 
|}

References

External links 
 Discovery Circumstances: Numbered Minor Planets (405001)–(410000) (IAU Minor Planet Center)

0405